= Schizonycha natalensis =

Scientific classification
- Kingdom: Animalia
- Phylum: Arthropoda
- Clade: Pancrustacea
- Class: Insecta
- Order: Coleoptera
- Suborder: Polyphaga
- Infraorder: Scarabaeiformia
- Family: Scarabaeidae
- Genus: Schizonycha
- Species: S. natalensis

Binomial name
- Schizonycha natalensis Brenske, 1896

Species of beetle

Schizonycha natalensis is a species of beetle of the family Scarabaeidae. It is found in South Africa (KwaZulu-Natal).

== Description ==
Adults reach a length of about 12–14 mm (0.47–0.55 in). They are piceous, or chestnut-brown and somewhat shining. The pronotum is covered with deep, round, sub-foveate punctures separated from each other by a space equal to their diameter, and a little wider in the median posterior part of the disk than on the anterior or on the sides, the walls are very slightly and irregularly raised and smooth. The scutellum has a lateral row of punctures. The elytra are covered with deep, closely set punctures separated by a space smaller than their diameter and bearing each a most minute hair, the intervals in the discoidal part are slightly coriaceous. The pygidium has deep, round, broadly scattered punctures.
