= Schizonycha testacea =

Scientific classification
- Kingdom: Animalia
- Phylum: Arthropoda
- Clade: Pancrustacea
- Class: Insecta
- Order: Coleoptera
- Suborder: Polyphaga
- Infraorder: Scarabaeiformia
- Family: Scarabaeidae
- Genus: Schizonycha
- Species: S. testacea

Binomial name
- Schizonycha testacea Moser, 1917

Species of beetle

Schizonycha testacea is a species of beetle of the family Scarabaeidae. It is found in Ethiopia.

== Description ==
Adults reach a length of about 11 mm. They are yellow, with a reddish tinge to the head and pronotum. The head is sparsely covered with large, but flat punctures. The lateral margins of the pronotum are fringed and the surface is fairly densely punctured, scarcely more so behind the anterior margin than in the rest of the body. The elytra have punctation, with small setae.
