= Schizonycha vethi =

Scientific classification
- Kingdom: Animalia
- Phylum: Arthropoda
- Clade: Pancrustacea
- Class: Insecta
- Order: Coleoptera
- Suborder: Polyphaga
- Infraorder: Scarabaeiformia
- Family: Scarabaeidae
- Genus: Schizonycha
- Species: S. vethi

Binomial name
- Schizonycha vethi Moser, 1917

Species of beetle

Schizonycha vethi is a species of beetle of the family Scarabaeidae. It is found in the Central African Republic and the Democratic Republic of the Congo.

== Description ==
Adults reach a length of about 17 mm. The antennae are brown. The pronotum is quite extensively covered with punctures, with short setae and with two smooth ridges before the posterior margin. The scutellum has only a few punctures. The elytra, pygidium and underside have a very fine, leathery sculpture. The slightly wrinkled elytra are moderately densely covered with minutely setate punctures.
