= Schizonycha setosipennis =

Scientific classification
- Kingdom: Animalia
- Phylum: Arthropoda
- Clade: Pancrustacea
- Class: Insecta
- Order: Coleoptera
- Suborder: Polyphaga
- Infraorder: Scarabaeiformia
- Family: Scarabaeidae
- Genus: Schizonycha
- Species: S. setosipennis

Binomial name
- Schizonycha setosipennis Moser, 1917

Species of beetle

Schizonycha setosipennis is a species of beetle of the family Scarabaeidae. It is found in Cameroon.

== Description ==
Adults reach a length of about 18 mm. They are yellowish-brown, but the head, pronotum, scutellum, and legs are reddish-brown. The head is somewhat granularly punctate, the punctures are setate. The surface of the pronotum has punctures with short setae and the scutellum has scattered punctures. The punctation of the weakly wrinkled elytra is moderately dense, the punctures with erect setae.
