= Schizonycha pauperata =

Scientific classification
- Kingdom: Animalia
- Phylum: Arthropoda
- Clade: Pancrustacea
- Class: Insecta
- Order: Coleoptera
- Suborder: Polyphaga
- Infraorder: Scarabaeiformia
- Family: Scarabaeidae
- Genus: Schizonycha
- Species: S. pauperata

Binomial name
- Schizonycha pauperata Péringuey, 1908

Species of beetle

Schizonycha pauperata is a species of beetle of the family Scarabaeidae. It is found in South Africa (North West).

== Description ==
Adults reach a length of about 13 mm (0.51 in). They are dark chestnut-brown and shiny, with the antennae ferruginous. The pronotum is covered with simple but deep elongate punctures separated by a slightly raised interval about equal to their diameter, and bearing each a squamiform white hair. The punctures on the head and neck are similar to those of the pronotum, except those of the neck which are not squamigerous. The scutellum has two lateral series of scaly punctures and the elytra are deeply punctate but with the intervals smooth, each puncture with a sub-squamose short hair. The apex of the propygidium and the pygidium are sparsely punctate.
