= Schizonycha rurigena =

Scientific classification
- Kingdom: Animalia
- Phylum: Arthropoda
- Clade: Pancrustacea
- Class: Insecta
- Order: Coleoptera
- Suborder: Polyphaga
- Infraorder: Scarabaeiformia
- Family: Scarabaeidae
- Genus: Schizonycha
- Species: S. rurigena

Binomial name
- Schizonycha rurigena Brenske, 1898

Species of beetle

Schizonycha rurigena is a species of beetle of the family Scarabaeidae. It is found in South Africa (KwaZulu-Natal) and Zimbabwe.

== Description ==
Adults reach a length of about 14 mm (0.55 in). They are ferruginous, with the head infuscate, and the elytra chestnut-brown. The club of the antennae is flavescent and all the punctures on the upper side have a very distinct greyish hair.
