= Schizonycha flavorufa =

Scientific classification
- Kingdom: Animalia
- Phylum: Arthropoda
- Clade: Pancrustacea
- Class: Insecta
- Order: Coleoptera
- Suborder: Polyphaga
- Infraorder: Scarabaeiformia
- Family: Scarabaeidae
- Genus: Schizonycha
- Species: S. flavorufa

Binomial name
- Schizonycha flavorufa Moser, 1917

Species of beetle

Schizonycha flavorufa is a species of beetle of the family Scarabaeidae. It is found in Ethiopia.

== Description ==
Adults reach a length of about 12–14 mm. They are yellowish-brown, but the head, pronotum and legs are reddish-brown. The head is finely punctate. The lateral margins of the pronotum are notched and fringed with yellow hairs and the surface is quite sparsely and irregularly punctured. Occasionally, an unpunctured spot is found in the middle. The scutellum is sparsely punctured and smooth in the middle. On the elytra, the punctures are moderately dense and show only extremely minute setae.
