= Schizonycha kadleci =

Scientific classification
- Kingdom: Animalia
- Phylum: Arthropoda
- Clade: Pancrustacea
- Class: Insecta
- Order: Coleoptera
- Suborder: Polyphaga
- Infraorder: Scarabaeiformia
- Family: Scarabaeidae
- Genus: Schizonycha
- Species: S. kadleci

Binomial name
- Schizonycha kadleci Bezděk & Sehnal, 2014

Species of beetle

Schizonycha kadleci is a species of beetle of the family Scarabaeidae. It is found in Yemen.

== Description ==
Adults reach a length of about 12.9–14.6 mm for males and 13.6–14.8 mm for females. The body is elongate, almost parallel and moderately convex. The dorsal and ventral surface are shiny, chestnut brown, with tiny, pale hairs. The dorsal surface of the head, pronotum, scutellum and elytra is covered with white short semi-erect scale-like hairs.

== Etymology ==
The species is named in honour Stanislav Kadlec, one of the collectors of the species.
