= Schizonycha rudicollis =

Scientific classification
- Kingdom: Animalia
- Phylum: Arthropoda
- Clade: Pancrustacea
- Class: Insecta
- Order: Coleoptera
- Suborder: Polyphaga
- Infraorder: Scarabaeiformia
- Family: Scarabaeidae
- Genus: Schizonycha
- Species: S. rudicollis

Binomial name
- Schizonycha rudicollis Moser, 1914

Species of beetle

Schizonycha rudicollis is a species of beetle of the family Scarabaeidae. It is found in Tanzania.

== Description ==
Adults reach a length of about 29 mm (1.1 in). They are similar to Schizonycha major, but is immediately distinguished by its much more densely punctate pronotum. The head is strongly punctate, the punctures on the frons are transverse, while those on the clypeus are round. The base of the frons is smooth, and there is also a smooth spot behind the middle of the clypeus keel. The anterior margin of the clypeus is emarginate. The antennae are reddish-brown. The pronotum is almost twice as wide as it is long, quite densely and coarsely punctate, the spaces between the punctures are weakly wrinkled, the lateral margins are only very weakly notched, the anterior and posterior angles are obtuse, and the transverse ridge on both sides before the posterior margin is smooth. The scutellum shows a group of punctures on each side. The elytra are weakly transversely wrinkled and moderately densely punctate, the punctures bearing tiny setae. The pygidium is unevenly covered with large umbilical punctures. The sides of the thorax, the episterna, and the hind coxae are strongly and fairly densely punctate, the punctures bearing yellow hairs.
