= Schizonycha kameruna =

Scientific classification
- Kingdom: Animalia
- Phylum: Arthropoda
- Clade: Pancrustacea
- Class: Insecta
- Order: Coleoptera
- Suborder: Polyphaga
- Infraorder: Scarabaeiformia
- Family: Scarabaeidae
- Genus: Schizonycha
- Species: S. kameruna

Binomial name
- Schizonycha kameruna Moser, 1916

Species of beetle

Schizonycha kameruna is a species of beetle of the family Scarabaeidae. It is found in Cameroon.

== Description ==
Adults reach a length of about 12 mm. The surface of the pronotum is quite sparsely and irregularly covered with punctures, with minute setae. The scutellum only has a few punctures and the elytra are slightly wrinkled and quite densely covered with minute punctures with setae.
