= Schizonycha kocheri =

Scientific classification
- Kingdom: Animalia
- Phylum: Arthropoda
- Clade: Pancrustacea
- Class: Insecta
- Order: Coleoptera
- Suborder: Polyphaga
- Infraorder: Scarabaeiformia
- Family: Scarabaeidae
- Genus: Schizonycha
- Species: S. kocheri

Binomial name
- Schizonycha kocheri Baraud, 1980

Species of beetle

Anoxia kocheri is a species of beetle of the family Scarabaeidae. It is found in Morocco.

== Description ==
Adults reach a length of about 12.5 mm (0.49 in). They have a convex, parallel, entirely reddish-brown body. The upper surface is glabrous and the underside has only a few very short hairs.
