= Schizonycha scorteccii =

Scientific classification
- Kingdom: Animalia
- Phylum: Arthropoda
- Clade: Pancrustacea
- Class: Insecta
- Order: Coleoptera
- Suborder: Polyphaga
- Infraorder: Scarabaeiformia
- Family: Scarabaeidae
- Genus: Schizonycha
- Species: S. scorteccii

Binomial name
- Schizonycha scorteccii Decelle, 1982

Species of beetle

Schizonycha scorteccii is a species of beetle of the family Scarabaeidae. It is found in Oman, Yemen and the United Arab Emirates.

== Description ==
Adults reach a length of about 8–10 mm (0.31–0.39 in). They have a cylindrical, dark red body. They are very shiny above and beneath and thinly covered with tiny setae.
