= Schizonycha disputabilis =

Scientific classification
- Kingdom: Animalia
- Phylum: Arthropoda
- Clade: Pancrustacea
- Class: Insecta
- Order: Coleoptera
- Suborder: Polyphaga
- Infraorder: Scarabaeiformia
- Family: Scarabaeidae
- Genus: Schizonycha
- Species: S. disputabilis

Binomial name
- Schizonycha disputabilis Péringuey, 1904

Species of beetle

Schizonycha disputabilis is a species of beetle of the family Scarabaeidae. It is found in Zimbabwe.

== Description ==
Adults reach a length of about 9 mm (0.35 in). They are very similar to Schizonycha puerilis, but they have a more transverse, non-sinuate clypeal carina. Furthermore, the penultimate abdominal segment is broader than the one preceding, and the shape of the genital armature differs greatly.
