= Schizonycha rufula =

Scientific classification
- Kingdom: Animalia
- Phylum: Arthropoda
- Clade: Pancrustacea
- Class: Insecta
- Order: Coleoptera
- Suborder: Polyphaga
- Infraorder: Scarabaeiformia
- Family: Scarabaeidae
- Genus: Schizonycha
- Species: S. rufula

Binomial name
- Schizonycha rufula Moser, 1914

Species of beetle

Schizonycha rufula is a species of beetle of the family Scarabaeidae. It is found in Ethiopia.

== Description ==
Adults reach a length of about 16 mm (0.63 in). They are similar to Schizonycha rhizotrogoides, but larger and the pronotum is not fringed with long cilia as in that species. The head is wrinkled and punctate, the clypeus keel is weakly curved, the anterior margin of the clypeus is barely emarginate. The pronotum is rather widely punctate posteriorly, becoming more closely punctate towards the anterior margin. The transverse ridge on each side before the posterior margin is only weakly and also punctate. The punctures bear minute setae. The lateral margins are weakly crenate, the anterior and posterior angles are obtuse, and the posterior margin is fringed with yellow cilia. The scutellum is almost smooth. The elytra are weakly wrinkled and densely punctate. The punctures are tiny and bristled. The pygidium is quite extensively covered with umbilical spots and is sometimes slightly wrinkled. The thorax, episterna, and hind coxae are densely covered with shaggy hairs in males, while they are sparsely haired in females. On the abdomen, the bristled spots are very widely spaced.
