= Schizonycha fimbriata =

Scientific classification
- Kingdom: Animalia
- Phylum: Arthropoda
- Clade: Pancrustacea
- Class: Insecta
- Order: Coleoptera
- Suborder: Polyphaga
- Infraorder: Scarabaeiformia
- Family: Scarabaeidae
- Genus: Schizonycha
- Species: S. fimbriata

Binomial name
- Schizonycha fimbriata Brenske, 1898

Synonyms
- Schizonycha vaalensis Péringuey, 1904

Species of beetle

Schizonycha fimbriata is a species of beetle of the family Scarabaeidae. It is found in South Africa (Northern Cape, Mpumalanga).

== Description ==
Adults reach a length of about 14–15 mm (0.55–0.59 in). They are castaneous and shining. The pronotum has an annulate-punctate disc, each puncture with a minute, pale yellowish-white seta. The elytra have punctures with setae similar to those on pronotum.
