= Schizonycha globa =

Scientific classification
- Kingdom: Animalia
- Phylum: Arthropoda
- Clade: Pancrustacea
- Class: Insecta
- Order: Coleoptera
- Suborder: Polyphaga
- Infraorder: Scarabaeiformia
- Family: Scarabaeidae
- Genus: Schizonycha
- Species: S. globa

Binomial name
- Schizonycha globa Pope, 1960

Species of beetle

Schizonycha globa is a species of beetle of the family Scarabaeidae. It is found in South Africa (KwaZulu-Natal).

== Description ==
Adults reach a length of about 11–13 mm (0.43–0.51 in). They are black and not very shining, with the antennae, tibiae and tarsi somewhat reddish.
