= Schizonycha brevicollis =

Scientific classification
- Kingdom: Animalia
- Phylum: Arthropoda
- Clade: Pancrustacea
- Class: Insecta
- Order: Coleoptera
- Suborder: Polyphaga
- Infraorder: Scarabaeiformia
- Family: Scarabaeidae
- Genus: Schizonycha
- Species: S. brevicollis

Binomial name
- Schizonycha brevicollis Moser, 1914

Species of beetle

Schizonycha brevicollis is a species of beetle of the family Scarabaeidae. It is found in the Democratic Republic of the Congo.

== Description ==
Adults reach a length of about 16 mm (0.63 in). They are similar in colour and shape to Schizonycha circularis, but larger. The head is weakly wrinkled and punctate, the clypeus keel is projecting in the middle, and the anterior margin of the clypeus is upturned and not sinuate. The pronotum is more than twice as wide as it is long, sparsely punctate, the ridge before the posterior margin is smooth. Behind the anterior margin, the pronotum is shallowly impressed laterally, the lateral margins are notched, and the anterior and posterior angles are shortly rounded. The scutellum is punctate only at the margins. The punctation of the elytra is quite dense, the scales of the punctures are minute. On the pygidium, the umbilical punctures are only sparsely spaced and are covered with whitish setae. The chest and episterna are covered with yellow hairs.
