= Schizonycha ovatula =

Scientific classification
- Kingdom: Animalia
- Phylum: Arthropoda
- Clade: Pancrustacea
- Class: Insecta
- Order: Coleoptera
- Suborder: Polyphaga
- Infraorder: Scarabaeiformia
- Family: Scarabaeidae
- Genus: Schizonycha
- Species: S. ovatula

Binomial name
- Schizonycha ovatula Brenske, 1898

Synonyms
- Schizonycha immixta Péringuey, 1904; Atys ovatula; Atys immixta

Species of beetle

Schizonycha ovatula is a species of beetle of the family Scarabaeidae. It is found in South Africa (Western Cape, Eastern Cape, KwaZulu-Natal).

== Description ==
Adults reach a length of about 11.5–13.5 mm (0.45–0.53 in). They are testaceous, with the elytra paler, but occasionally totally sub-ferruginous. The club of the antennae is sub-flavescent. The pronotum is covered with equi-distant round punctures, separated by somewhat narrow, very slightly raised, smooth walls, from the centre of the discoidal part there runs a narrow, smooth, longitudinal band reaching the base, and the transverse supra-basal folds have disappeared entirely, the outer margins show very little traces of serration. The scutellum has one lateral row of punctures and the elytra are covered with round punctures separated by smooth intervals. The hairs are most minute. The upper half of the pygidium is set with irregular deep punctures, while the lower half is impunctate.
