= Schizonycha confinis =

Scientific classification
- Kingdom: Animalia
- Phylum: Arthropoda
- Clade: Pancrustacea
- Class: Insecta
- Order: Coleoptera
- Suborder: Polyphaga
- Infraorder: Scarabaeiformia
- Family: Scarabaeidae
- Genus: Schizonycha
- Species: S. confinis

Binomial name
- Schizonycha confinis Péringuey, 1904

Species of beetle

Schizonycha confinis is a species of beetle of the family Scarabaeidae. It is found in Zimbabwe.

== Description ==
Adults reach a length of about 14 mm (0.55 in). They are siena-brown, clothed above and under with very dense greyish, very squamiform hairs. The pronotum is covered with small, nearly contiguous round punctures, and has no raised transverse supra-basal fold. The scutellum is very closely punctate all over and the elytra have deep but small punctures. The pygidium is also closely punctured, the punctures equal and separated by an interval not equal to their own diameter.
