= Schizonycha ignava =

Scientific classification
- Kingdom: Animalia
- Phylum: Arthropoda
- Clade: Pancrustacea
- Class: Insecta
- Order: Coleoptera
- Suborder: Polyphaga
- Infraorder: Scarabaeiformia
- Family: Scarabaeidae
- Genus: Schizonycha
- Species: S. ignava

Binomial name
- Schizonycha ignava Péringuey, 1904

Species of beetle

Schizonycha ignava is a species of beetle of the family Scarabaeidae. It is found in South Africa (Mpumalanga) and Zimbabwe.

== Description ==
Adults reach a length of about 8.5–11 mm (0.33–0.43 in). They are pale testaceous, but with the head, pronotum, and legs light testaceous-red. The pronotum is covered laterally and broadly along the anterior margin with closely set, asperous punctures, but on the discoidal part the punctures from about the median part to the base are round and non-asperous. In the centre of the disk there is an elongated smooth patch. The scutellum is pluri-punctate on each side and the elytra are deeply punctured, the diameter of the intervals lesser than that of the punctures, and coriaceous in the dorsal part. The pygidium has moderately closely set punctures, leaving a median smooth longitudinal band.
