= Schizonycha vryburgensis =

Scientific classification
- Kingdom: Animalia
- Phylum: Arthropoda
- Clade: Pancrustacea
- Class: Insecta
- Order: Coleoptera
- Suborder: Polyphaga
- Infraorder: Scarabaeiformia
- Family: Scarabaeidae
- Genus: Schizonycha
- Species: S. vryburgensis

Binomial name
- Schizonycha vryburgensis Pope, 1960

Species of beetle

Schizonycha vryburgensis is a species of beetle of the family Scarabaeidae. It is found in South Africa (North West).

== Description ==
Adults reach a length of about 12.5–14 mm (0.49–0.55 in). They are dull orange. The lateral borders of the pronotum have long setae and the disc has irregularly and sparsely arranged punctures, each with a small but distinct, white seta. The elytra also have punctures with setae similar to those of the pronotum.
