= Schizonycha inostralis =

Scientific classification
- Kingdom: Animalia
- Phylum: Arthropoda
- Clade: Pancrustacea
- Class: Insecta
- Order: Coleoptera
- Suborder: Polyphaga
- Infraorder: Scarabaeiformia
- Family: Scarabaeidae
- Genus: Schizonycha
- Species: S. inostralis

Binomial name
- Schizonycha inostralis Pope, 1960

Species of beetle

Schizonycha inostralis is a species of beetle of the family Scarabaeidae. It is found in South Africa (Eastern Cape).

== Description ==
Adults reach a length of about 15 mm (0.59 in). They are deep pitchy-red and shining. The pronotum has crenulate lateral borders with rather short setae and the surface has no clearly indicated impunctate areas. The disc has coarse punctures, each with a small seta. The elytra have punctures with small setae.
