= Schizonycha verrucosa =

Scientific classification
- Kingdom: Animalia
- Phylum: Arthropoda
- Clade: Pancrustacea
- Class: Insecta
- Order: Coleoptera
- Suborder: Polyphaga
- Infraorder: Scarabaeiformia
- Family: Scarabaeidae
- Genus: Schizonycha
- Species: S. verrucosa

Binomial name
- Schizonycha verrucosa Moser, 1914

Species of beetle

Schizonycha verrucosa is a species of beetle of the family Scarabaeidae. It is found in Kenya.

== Description ==
Adults reach a length of about 16 mm (0.63 in). They are similar to Schizonycha sansibarica. The head is punctate. The clypeus keel is quite strongly projecting in the middle, the anterior margin of the clypeus is emarginate. The antennae are brown, with the club yellow. The pronotum is wider than long and irregularly and rather sparsely covered with coarse punctures, which bear small bristle-like scales. The transverse ridge before the posterior margin is smooth. The lateral margins are notched, the anterior and posterior angles are obtuse. The scutellum bears only a few punctures beside the lateral margins. The elytra are weakly transversely wrinkled and moderately densely covered with coarse punctures bearing small, white setae. The pygidium is only very weakly and sparsely punctured.
