= Schizonycha suturalis =

Scientific classification
- Kingdom: Animalia
- Phylum: Arthropoda
- Clade: Pancrustacea
- Class: Insecta
- Order: Coleoptera
- Suborder: Polyphaga
- Infraorder: Scarabaeiformia
- Family: Scarabaeidae
- Genus: Schizonycha
- Species: S. suturalis

Binomial name
- Schizonycha suturalis Moser, 1914

Species of beetle

Schizonycha suturalis is a species of beetle of the family Scarabaeidae. It is found in Ethiopia.

== Description ==
Adults reach a length of about 16–17 mm (0.63–0.67 in). They are similar to Schizonycha bicolor, but they are easily recognizable by the presence of a broad, weak rib on both sides of the suture on the elytra. The head is robust, weakly wrinkled and punctate. The pronotum is almost twice as wide as it is long and rather sparsely punctate, the lateral margins are notched, and the anterior and posterior angles are obtuse. The punctures on the scutellum are widely spaced. The weakly transversely wrinkled elytra are densely covered with punctures, which bear mostly minute setae visible only under a magnifying glass. The pygidium is sparsely punctate. The chest, episterna, and hind coxae are sparsely haired. The abdomen is only sparsely punctured in the middle, but extensively punctured on the sides, and the some punctures bear short setae, while others have longer setae.
