= Schizonycha scabiosa =

Scientific classification
- Kingdom: Animalia
- Phylum: Arthropoda
- Clade: Pancrustacea
- Class: Insecta
- Order: Coleoptera
- Suborder: Polyphaga
- Infraorder: Scarabaeiformia
- Family: Scarabaeidae
- Genus: Schizonycha
- Species: S. scabiosa

Binomial name
- Schizonycha scabiosa Péringuey, 1904

Species of beetle

Schizonycha scabiosa is a species of beetle of the family Scarabaeidae. It is found in South Africa (Eastern Cape).

== Description ==
Adults reach a length of about 14–14.5 mm (0.55–0.57 in). They are chestnut-brown, each puncture bearing a minute whitish hair. The club of the antennae is flavescent and the head and clypeus are closely scabroso-punctate. The pronotum has strongly serrate margins in the anterior part, and the surface is covered with cicatricose punctures asperous in the anterior part, larger and smoother in the posterior, where they are divided by narrow, smooth, irregular walls, and in the posterior part of the disk there is a smooth, median longitudinal band. The scutellum has a duplicate lateral row of punctures and the elytra are deeply punctate. The pygidium has deep, somewhat closely set foveolate punctures.
