= Schizonycha effeta =

Scientific classification
- Kingdom: Animalia
- Phylum: Arthropoda
- Clade: Pancrustacea
- Class: Insecta
- Order: Coleoptera
- Suborder: Polyphaga
- Infraorder: Scarabaeiformia
- Family: Scarabaeidae
- Genus: Schizonycha
- Species: S. effeta

Binomial name
- Schizonycha effeta Péringuey, 1908

Species of beetle

Schizonycha effeta is a species of beetle of the family Scarabaeidae. It is found in South Africa (Limpopo, Eastern Cape).

== Description ==
Adults reach a length of about 10–11 mm (0.39–0.43 in). The head and pronotum are testaceous-red, while the elytra are paler testaceous. The surface of both the clypeus and frontal part of the head is covered with large, round, nearly coalescing punctures separated by a very narrow, slightly raised wall. The pronotum is covered with cicatricose punctures divided by a smooth space equal to their own diameter, and slightly larger and less cicatricose in the centre, where there is a very small impunctate area. The supra-basal fold is somewhat punctate. The scutellum has one lateral row of punctures and the elytra are covered with sub-cicatricose punctures separated by an interval equal to their diameter and almost imperceptibly setigerous. The pygidium has a few punctures only on the sides of the anterior part.
