= Schizonycha microlepida =

Scientific classification
- Kingdom: Animalia
- Phylum: Arthropoda
- Clade: Pancrustacea
- Class: Insecta
- Order: Coleoptera
- Suborder: Polyphaga
- Infraorder: Scarabaeiformia
- Family: Scarabaeidae
- Genus: Schizonycha
- Species: S. microlepida

Binomial name
- Schizonycha microlepida Moser, 1919

Species of beetle

Schizonycha microlepida is a species of beetle of the family Scarabaeidae. It is found in Tanzania.

== Description ==
Adults reach a length of about 9–10 mm. They are reddish-brown, with the pronotum, scutellum and legs red. The head is granularly punctate and the punctures are covered with pale setae. The clypeus is rounded. The pronotum is strongly tapered anteriorly and posteriorly, slightly constricted behind the anterior margin. The ridge at the posterior margin is smooth, the punctures are needle-like and become somewhat granular towards the anterior margin. The elytra, like the pygidium, show a fine, leathery sculpture and the appressed white setae are scale-like.
