= Schizonycha usaramae =

Scientific classification
- Kingdom: Animalia
- Phylum: Arthropoda
- Clade: Pancrustacea
- Class: Insecta
- Order: Coleoptera
- Suborder: Polyphaga
- Infraorder: Scarabaeiformia
- Family: Scarabaeidae
- Genus: Schizonycha
- Species: S. usaramae

Binomial name
- Schizonycha usaramae Brenske, 1898

Species of beetle

Schizonycha usaramae is a species of beetle of the family Scarabaeidae. It is found in Tanzania.

== Description ==
Adults reach a length of about 9 mm (0.35 in). They are very delicate, slender, and yellowish-brown. The scales are weak above, only somewhat more distinct on the sides of the thorax, and here also with longer hairs. The clypeus is very short, the frontal keel distinct, the frons densely granularly punctate. The pronotum is only slightly transverse, anteriorly roughened as in typical Schizonycha species, densely granularly punctate, the ridge smooth and shiny. The pygidium is rounded, more coarsely punctate, the punctures not deep. The abdomen is longitudinally impressed, finely punctate-haired laterally.
