= Schizonycha divulsa =

Scientific classification
- Kingdom: Animalia
- Phylum: Arthropoda
- Clade: Pancrustacea
- Class: Insecta
- Order: Coleoptera
- Suborder: Polyphaga
- Infraorder: Scarabaeiformia
- Family: Scarabaeidae
- Genus: Schizonycha
- Species: S. divulsa

Binomial name
- Schizonycha divulsa Péringuey, 1904

Species of beetle

Schizonycha divulsa is a species of beetle of the family Scarabaeidae. It is found in South Africa (Mpumalanga, North West) and Zimbabwe.

== Description ==
Adults reach a length of about 11.5–12 mm (0.45–0.47 in). They have a narrow, sub-parallel, pale testaceous body, with the head, pronotum and legs slightly testaceous-red. They are covered with minute whitish hairs issuing from the punctures on the upper and under sides.
