= Schizonycha excisiceps =

Scientific classification
- Kingdom: Animalia
- Phylum: Arthropoda
- Clade: Pancrustacea
- Class: Insecta
- Order: Coleoptera
- Suborder: Polyphaga
- Infraorder: Scarabaeiformia
- Family: Scarabaeidae
- Genus: Schizonycha
- Species: S. excisiceps

Binomial name
- Schizonycha excisiceps (Moser, 1914)

Synonyms
- Etischiza excisiceps Moser, 1914

Species of beetle

Schizonycha excisiceps is a species of beetle of the family Scarabaeidae. It is found in the Democratic Republic of the Congo.

== Description ==
Adults reach a length of about 11 mm (0.43 in). They are yellowish-brown, with the head and pronotum reddish-brown. The head is moderately densely punctured, the vertex strongly keeled. The frons slopes steeply, but the anterior margin of the clypeus is not completely flat and sinuate. Instead, it has a short, deep, semicircular incision in the middle. The antennae are yellowish-brown. The pronotum is about half as wide as it is long, with sparse punctures posteriorly. Towards the front, the punctures become somewhat denser and slightly rasp-like. The punctures bear minute setae. The anterior margin of the pronotum is slightly projecting laterally behind the eyes and the posterior angles are broadly rounded, and the anterior angles are obtuse. The scutellum and elytra are moderately densely punctured, with the punctures bearing barely perceptible setae. The pygidium and underside show, in addition to extremely dense and fine punctation, widely spaced, coarser punctures. On the pygidium, the coarser punctures are covered with very short setae, while on the underside they bear bristle-like hairs.
