= Schizonycha collarti =

Scientific classification
- Kingdom: Animalia
- Phylum: Arthropoda
- Clade: Pancrustacea
- Class: Insecta
- Order: Coleoptera
- Suborder: Polyphaga
- Infraorder: Scarabaeiformia
- Family: Scarabaeidae
- Genus: Schizonycha
- Species: S. collarti

Binomial name
- Schizonycha collarti Burgeon, 1946

Species of beetle

Schizonycha collarti is a species of beetle of the family Scarabaeidae. It is found in the Democratic Republic of the Congo.
