= Schizonycha geilenkeuseri =

Scientific classification
- Kingdom: Animalia
- Phylum: Arthropoda
- Clade: Pancrustacea
- Class: Insecta
- Order: Coleoptera
- Suborder: Polyphaga
- Infraorder: Scarabaeiformia
- Family: Scarabaeidae
- Genus: Schizonycha
- Species: S. geilenkeuseri

Binomial name
- Schizonycha geilenkeuseri Brenske, 1898

Synonyms
- Schizonycha exasperans Péringuey, 1904

Species of beetle

Schizonycha geilenkeuseri is a species of beetle of the family Scarabaeidae. It is found in Namibia and South Africa (North West).

== Description ==
Adults reach a length of about 11.5–12.5 mm (0.45–0.49 in). They are testaceous with the head and pronotum usually darker. The pronotum has shallow, slightly transverse punctures bearing minute setae. The elytra has punctures bearing minute, narrowly squamiform setae, which are more conspicuous than those of pronotal disc.
