= Schizonycha globator =

Scientific classification
- Kingdom: Animalia
- Phylum: Arthropoda
- Clade: Pancrustacea
- Class: Insecta
- Order: Coleoptera
- Suborder: Polyphaga
- Infraorder: Scarabaeiformia
- Family: Scarabaeidae
- Genus: Schizonycha
- Species: S. globator

Binomial name
- Schizonycha globator (Fabricius, 1781)

Synonyms
- Scarabaeus globator Fabricius, 1781; Schizonycha idonea Péringuey, 1904

Species of beetle

Schizonycha globator is a species of beetle of the family Scarabaeidae. It is found in South Africa (Western Cape).

== Description ==
Adults reach a length of about 11.5–12 mm (0.45–0.47 in). They are black and opaque, with the antennae ferruginous. The pronotum and anterior half of the elytra are fringed with long, moderately dense fulvous hairs which in the posterior part of the elytra are replaced by a thick, brush-like band of fulvous ones. The legs are hairy and piceous-brown.
