= Schizonycha angustata =

Scientific classification
- Kingdom: Animalia
- Phylum: Arthropoda
- Clade: Pancrustacea
- Class: Insecta
- Order: Coleoptera
- Suborder: Polyphaga
- Infraorder: Scarabaeiformia
- Family: Scarabaeidae
- Genus: Schizonycha
- Species: S. angustata

Binomial name
- Schizonycha angustata Kolbe, 1895

Synonyms
- Schizonycha yemenensis Arrow, 1944; Schizonycha dakarana Brenske, 1898

Species of beetle

Schizonycha angustata is a species of beetle of the family Scarabaeidae. It is found in Kenya, from Senegal to Ethiopia and in Saudi Arabia, Yemen and Oman.

== Description ==
Adults reach a length of about 11–13 mm (0.43–0.51 in). The pattern of scales on the upper surface varies among populations. Populations from the Arabian Peninsula (ssp. yemenensis) have scattered punctures on the pronotum and small scales on the upper surface.

== Subspecies ==
- Schizonycha angustata angustata (Kenya, Senegal to Ethiopia)
- Schizonycha angustata yemenensis Arrow, 1944 (Saudi Arabia, Yemen, Oman)
