= Schizonycha eggeliana =

Scientific classification
- Kingdom: Animalia
- Phylum: Arthropoda
- Clade: Pancrustacea
- Class: Insecta
- Order: Coleoptera
- Suborder: Polyphaga
- Infraorder: Scarabaeiformia
- Family: Scarabaeidae
- Genus: Schizonycha
- Species: S. eggeliana

Binomial name
- Schizonycha eggeliana Kolbe, 1914

Species of beetle

Schizonycha eggeliana is a species of beetle of the family Scarabaeidae. It is found in Tanzania.

== Description ==
Adults reach a length of about 19 mm (0.75 in). They are similar to Schizonycha major. They are slightly smaller, but relatively shorter, similarly sculpted and hairy.
