= Schizonycha flaveola =

Scientific classification
- Kingdom: Animalia
- Phylum: Arthropoda
- Clade: Pancrustacea
- Class: Insecta
- Order: Coleoptera
- Suborder: Polyphaga
- Infraorder: Scarabaeiformia
- Family: Scarabaeidae
- Genus: Schizonycha
- Species: S. flaveola

Binomial name
- Schizonycha flaveola Moser, 1917

Species of beetle

Schizonycha flaveola is a species of beetle of the family Scarabaeidae. It is found in Ethiopia.

== Description ==
Adults reach a length of about 11 mm. They are yellow, with reddish head and pronotum. The head is granularly punctate. The lateral margins of the pronotum are fringed with hairs and the surface is strongly and rather densely punctate, most densely behind the anterior margin. The punctures have small setae. The elytra are rather densely covered with punctures with minute setae.
