= Schizonycha canala =

Scientific classification
- Kingdom: Animalia
- Phylum: Arthropoda
- Clade: Pancrustacea
- Class: Insecta
- Order: Coleoptera
- Suborder: Polyphaga
- Infraorder: Scarabaeiformia
- Family: Scarabaeidae
- Genus: Schizonycha
- Species: S. canala

Binomial name
- Schizonycha canala (Paulian, 1991)

Synonyms
- Lepesmonyx canala Paulian, 1991

Species of beetle

Schizonycha canala is a species of beetle of the family Scarabaeidae. It is found in New Caledonia.

== Description ==
Adults reach a length of about 15 mm (0.59 in). They have a parallel-sided, cylindrical, not very convex body. The forebody, suture and legs are blackish-brown, while the elytra and club of the antennae are reddish.
