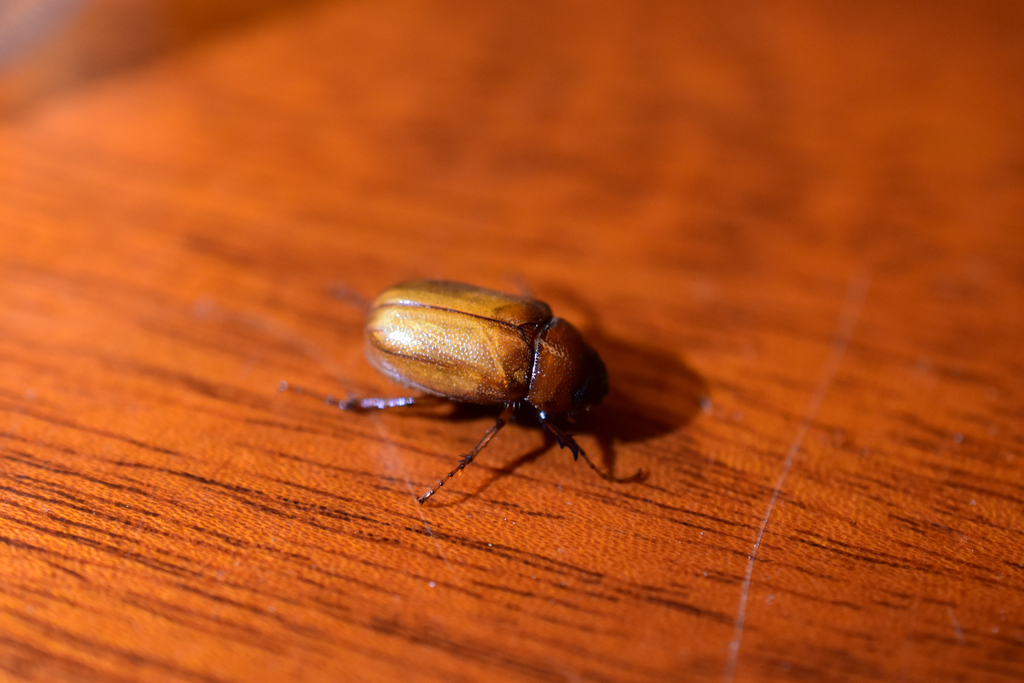
- Schizonycha ruficollis

Scientific classification
- Kingdom: Animalia
- Phylum: Arthropoda
- Clade: Pancrustacea
- Class: Insecta
- Order: Coleoptera
- Suborder: Polyphaga
- Infraorder: Scarabaeiformia
- Family: Scarabaeidae
- Subfamily: Melolonthinae
- Tribe: Schizonychini
- Genus: Schizonycha; Dejean, 1833

Synonyms
- Lepesmonyx Paulian, 1991

= Schizonycha =

Genus of leaf beetles

Schizonycha, also known as splitclaw scarabs, schizonychs, schizonychans or longleg chafers, is a genus of beetles belonging to the family Scarabaeidae.

== Species ==
- Subgenus Etischiza Brenske, 1898
  - Schizonycha excisiceps (Moser, 1914)
  - Schizonycha heudelotii Blanchard, 1851
  - Schizonycha iringana (Moser, 1914)
  - Schizonycha mussitans (Kolbe, 1914)
- Subgenus Schizonycha
  - Schizonycha abdicta Brenske, 1898
  - Schizonycha abenaba Pope, 1960
  - Schizonycha abrupta Pope, 1960
  - Schizonycha abscondita Pope, 1960
  - Schizonycha abyssinica Blanchard, 1851
  - Schizonycha affinis Boheman, 1857
  - Schizonycha africana (Laporte, 1840)
  - Schizonycha algirina Fairmaire, 1876
  - Schizonycha algoa Péringuey, 1904
  - Schizonycha ambigua Péringuey, 1908
  - Schizonycha amitina Kolbe, 1897
  - Schizonycha amoena Brenske, 1898
  - Schizonycha ampliaticollis Burgeon, 1946
  - Schizonycha angolana Brenske, 1898
  - Schizonycha angolensis Moser, 1916
  - Schizonycha angulata Kolbe, 1895
  - Schizonycha angustata Kolbe, 1895
  - Schizonycha angustiformis Fairmaire, 1892
  - Schizonycha angustula Moser, 1914
  - Schizonycha armipes Moser, 1914
  - Schizonycha aruficollis Mittal & Pajni, 1977
  - Schizonycha aschantica Brenske, 1898
  - Schizonycha aspera Brenske, 1898
  - Schizonycha aspericollis Fairmaire, 1892
  - Schizonycha attenuata Kolbe, 1914
  - Schizonycha balaena Burgeon, 1946
  - Schizonycha barda Burmeister, 1855
  - Schizonycha benguellana Moser, 1918
  - Schizonycha biangulata Fairmaire, 1885
  - Schizonycha bicolor Kolbe, 1895
  - Schizonycha bicolorata Moser, 1917
  - Schizonycha bidentata Burgeon, 1946
  - Schizonycha biimpressicollis Moser, 1920
  - Schizonycha bohemani Pope, 1960
  - Schizonycha bomuana Brenske, 1899
  - Schizonycha borana Gridelli, 1939
  - Schizonycha boschimana Péringuey, 1904
  - Schizonycha bottegoi Brenske, 1895
  - Schizonycha brevicollis Moser, 1914
  - Schizonycha buettikeri Sabatinelli & Pontuale, 1998
  - Schizonycha bukobana Kolbe, 1914
  - Schizonycha callosicollis Moser, 1924
  - Schizonycha canala (Paulian, 1991)
  - Schizonycha capensis Burmeister, 1855
  - Schizonycha carbonaria Boheman, 1857
  - Schizonycha castanea Moser, 1917
  - Schizonycha caudata Burgeon, 1946
  - Schizonycha cervina Reiche, 1850
  - Schizonycha chaetolepida Moser, 1914
  - Schizonycha ciliata Burmeister, 1855
  - Schizonycha circularis Brenske, 1899
  - Schizonycha citima Péringuey, 1904
  - Schizonycha clypealis Pope, 1960
  - Schizonycha collarti Burgeon, 1946
  - Schizonycha colmanti Brenske, 1899
  - Schizonycha comosa Burmeister, 1855
  - Schizonycha compacta Pope, 1960
  - Schizonycha confinis Péringuey, 1904
  - Schizonycha congoana Brenske, 1898
  - Schizonycha consobrina Klug, 1855
  - Schizonycha constrata Péringuey, 1904
  - Schizonycha consueta Kolbe, 1895
  - Schizonycha continens Péringuey, 1904
  - Schizonycha cordofana Burmeister, 1855
  - Schizonycha crenata (Gyllenhal, 1817)
  - Schizonycha crenaticollis Moser, 1914
  - Schizonycha crenicollis Moser, 1924
  - Schizonycha crenulata Moser, 1924
  - Schizonycha cribrata Blanchard, 1851
  - Schizonycha crinita Brenske, 1898
  - Schizonycha cylindrata Quedenfeldt, 1884
  - Schizonycha cylindrica Moser, 1914
  - Schizonycha damarina Péringuey, 1908
  - Schizonycha debilis Burmeister, 1855
  - Schizonycha deceptor Pope, 1960
  - Schizonycha decipiens Arrow, 1944
  - Schizonycha deserta Moser, 1914
  - Schizonycha diehli Muche, 1961
  - Schizonycha dilucida Brenske, 1898
  - Schizonycha diredauana Moser, 1917
  - Schizonycha discocalcarata Gridelli, 1939
  - Schizonycha disputabilis Péringuey, 1904
  - Schizonycha dissensa Péringuey, 1904
  - Schizonycha dissimilis Péringuey, 1904
  - Schizonycha distincta Moser, 1914
  - Schizonycha distinguenda Moser, 1914
  - Schizonycha divulsa Péringuey, 1904
  - Schizonycha dumonti Peyerimhoff, 1926
  - Schizonycha duplicata Kolbe, 1895
  - Schizonycha durbana Péringuey, 1904
  - Schizonycha effeta Péringuey, 1908
  - Schizonycha eggeliana Kolbe, 1914
  - Schizonycha elegans Péringuey, 1904
  - Schizonycha elongata Blanchard, 1851
  - Schizonycha elongatula Dalla Torre, 1912
  - Schizonycha eremita Brenske, 1898
  - Schizonycha errabunda Brenske, 1898
  - Schizonycha ertli Moser, 1919
  - Schizonycha etischizoides Moser, 1914
  - Schizonycha exclusa Brenske, 1898
  - Schizonycha exigua Brenske, 1898
  - Schizonycha fartula Péringuey, 1904
  - Schizonycha fatidica Péringuey, 1904
  - Schizonycha feirana Péringuey, 1908
  - Schizonycha ferruginea Kolbe, 1895
  - Schizonycha ferrugineipennis Moser, 1924
  - Schizonycha filiola Moser, 1917
  - Schizonycha fimbriata Brenske, 1898
  - Schizonycha flabellata Burgeon, 1946
  - Schizonycha flaveola Moser, 1917
  - Schizonycha flavescens Brenske, 1898
  - Schizonycha flavicornis Brenske, 1898
  - Schizonycha flavorufa Moser, 1917
  - Schizonycha fourchei Burgeon, 1946
  - Schizonycha fraudigera Péringuey, 1904
  - Schizonycha frontalis Moser, 1921
  - Schizonycha fulvicornis Moser, 1919
  - Schizonycha fulvipennis Moser, 1914
  - Schizonycha fulvonitens Fairmaire, 1887
  - Schizonycha fusca Kolbe, 1895
  - Schizonycha fuscescens Blanchard, 1851
  - Schizonycha gallana Brenske, 1895
  - Schizonycha geilenkeuseri Brenske, 1898
  - Schizonycha genitalis Moser, 1924
  - Schizonycha gerstaeckeri Kolbe, 1895
  - Schizonycha gibbitarsa Brenske, 1899
  - Schizonycha glabra Brenske, 1890
  - Schizonycha globa Pope, 1960
  - Schizonycha globator (Fabricius, 1781)
  - Schizonycha gonaqua Péringuey, 1904
  - Schizonycha gonaquoides Pope, 1960
  - Schizonycha gracilis Brenske, 1898
  - Schizonycha granulata Kolbe, 1895
  - Schizonycha granulicollis Kolbe, 1914
  - Schizonycha graueri Moser, 1918
  - Schizonycha grossa Brenske, 1898
  - Schizonycha hahoensis Brenske, 1898
  - Schizonycha hamata Kolbe, 1891
  - Schizonycha hamifera Moser, 1914
  - Schizonycha hauseri Nonfried, 1891
  - Schizonycha hecistopsiloides Brenske, 1898
  - Schizonycha hermanni Brenske, 1898
  - Schizonycha humbloti Lacroix, 1989
  - Schizonycha ignava Péringuey, 1904
  - Schizonycha imitatrix Moser, 1914
  - Schizonycha impressa Khan & Ghai, 1980
  - Schizonycha inaequalis Moser, 1914
  - Schizonycha increta Péringuey, 1904
  - Schizonycha inedita Péringuey, 1904
  - Schizonycha infantilis Péringuey, 1904
  - Schizonycha infarsa Péringuey, 1904
  - Schizonycha inflativentris Moser, 1920
  - Schizonycha inops Péringuey, 1904
  - Schizonycha inostralis Pope, 1960
  - Schizonycha insuesa Péringuey, 1904
  - Schizonycha insularis Kolbe, 1913
  - Schizonycha insulicola Dalla Torre, 1912
  - Schizonycha integra Fairmaire, 1893
  - Schizonycha interna Brenske, 1899
  - Schizonycha irangiana Moser, 1919
  - Schizonycha jokona Moser, 1916
  - Schizonycha jordani Pope, 1960
  - Schizonycha juncta Kolbe, 1891
  - Schizonycha kabindana Moser, 1924
  - Schizonycha kadleci Bezděk & Sehnal, 2014
  - Schizonycha kakomae Brenske, 1898
  - Schizonycha kameruna Moser, 1916
  - Schizonycha katangana Burgeon, 1946
  - Schizonycha keniana Moser, 1914
  - Schizonycha keniensis Moser, 1919
  - Schizonycha kigonserana Moser, 1920
  - Schizonycha kirumbana Moser, 1924
  - Schizonycha kivuensis Burgeon, 1946
  - Schizonycha kiwuana Kolbe, 1914
  - Schizonycha kocheri Baraud, 1980
  - Schizonycha kochi Pope, 1960
  - Schizonycha kolbei Brenske, 1897
  - Schizonycha kristenseni Moser, 1914
  - Schizonycha laeviscutata Moser, 1914
  - Schizonycha languens Péringuey, 1904
  - Schizonycha laticia Pope, 1960
  - Schizonycha layeti Peyerimhoff, 1935
  - Schizonycha lebidis Pope, 1960
  - Schizonycha lembana Burgeon, 1946
  - Schizonycha lepichaeta Moser, 1914
  - Schizonycha lepidiota Moser, 1914
  - Schizonycha lepidophora Moser, 1914
  - Schizonycha leupolti Kolbe, 1914
  - Schizonycha lindiana Brenske, 1898
  - Schizonycha litoralis Moser, 1914
  - Schizonycha livada Pope, 1960
  - Schizonycha livida Klug, 1855
  - Schizonycha loandana Moser, 1918
  - Schizonycha longa Moser, 1917
  - Schizonycha longitarsis Linell, 1896
  - Schizonycha longula Moser, 1914
  - Schizonycha lukulediana Moser, 1917
  - Schizonycha luridipennis Moser, 1914
  - Schizonycha lutescens Quedenfeldt, 1884
  - Schizonycha macrophylla Moser, 1916
  - Schizonycha major Kolbe, 1895
  - Schizonycha manicana Péringuey, 1904
  - Schizonycha manowensis Moser, 1914
  - Schizonycha marginata Pope, 1960
  - Schizonycha maritima Moser, 1914
  - Schizonycha matabelena Péringuey, 1908
  - Schizonycha mediastina Péringuey, 1904
  - Schizonycha meinhardti Brenske, 1898
  - Schizonycha meracula Péringuey, 1904
  - Schizonycha methneri Moser, 1914
  - Schizonycha microlepida Moser, 1919
  - Schizonycha microphylla Moser, 1917
  - Schizonycha mimocontinens Pope, 1960
  - Schizonycha minima Péringuey, 1904
  - Schizonycha minor Pope, 1960
  - Schizonycha minuta Raffray, 1877
  - Schizonycha modesta Harold, 1879
  - Schizonycha montana Kolbe, 1910
  - Schizonycha muansana Moser, 1924
  - Schizonycha mucorea Fairmaire, 1887
  - Schizonycha nairobiensis Moser, 1914
  - Schizonycha natalensis Brenske, 1896
  - Schizonycha neglecta Boheman, 1857
  - Schizonycha nigricornis Burmeister, 1855
  - Schizonycha nilotica Blanchard, 1851
  - Schizonycha noscitata Péringuey, 1904
  - Schizonycha nyassica Kolbe, 1895
  - Schizonycha obscuricolor Pic, 1905
  - Schizonycha occipitalis Raffray, 1877
  - Schizonycha ovampoana Péringuey, 1904
  - Schizonycha ovatula Brenske, 1898
  - Schizonycha overlaeti Burgeon, 1946
  - Schizonycha parallela Moser, 1914
  - Schizonycha parilis Péringuey, 1904
  - Schizonycha parva Moser, 1914
  - Schizonycha parvula Brenske, 1895
  - Schizonycha paterna Kolbe, 1913
  - Schizonycha pauperata Péringuey, 1908
  - Schizonycha pectoralis Moser, 1921
  - Schizonycha perforata Burmeister, 1855
  - Schizonycha peringueyi Dalla Torre, 1912
  - Schizonycha perplexabilis Péringuey, 1904
  - Schizonycha piceonigra Pope, 1960
  - Schizonycha pilosa Moser, 1914
  - Schizonycha profuga Péringuey, 1904
  - Schizonycha propinqua Kolbe, 1891
  - Schizonycha pseudoparvula Gridelli, 1939
  - Schizonycha pseudosquamifera Pope, 1960
  - Schizonycha puerilis Péringuey, 1904
  - Schizonycha puguensis Moser, 1924
  - Schizonycha puncticollis Boheman, 1857
  - Schizonycha pygidialis Arrow, 1944
  - Schizonycha pygmaea Kolbe, 1895
  - Schizonycha quaesita Péringuey, 1904
  - Schizonycha retusa (Gyllenhal, 1817)
  - Schizonycha rhizotrogoides Brenske, 1899
  - Schizonycha rhodesiana Moser, 1920
  - Schizonycha richardi Burgeon, 1946
  - Schizonycha rodhaini Moser, 1924
  - Schizonycha rorida Gerstaecker, 1867
  - Schizonycha rotunda Pope, 1960
  - Schizonycha ruandana Burgeon, 1946
  - Schizonycha rubricollis Moser, 1919
  - Schizonycha rudicollis Moser, 1914
  - Schizonycha ruficollis (Fabricius, 1781)
  - Schizonycha rufina Boheman, 1857
  - Schizonycha rufoflava Moser, 1914
  - Schizonycha rufula Moser, 1914
  - Schizonycha rugifrons Moser, 1914
  - Schizonycha rugosa Brenske, 1898
  - Schizonycha rurigena Brenske, 1898
  - Schizonycha russula Boheman, 1857
  - Schizonycha saga Péringuey, 1904
  - Schizonycha saginata Péringuey, 1904
  - Schizonycha salaama Brenske, 1898
  - Schizonycha salisburiana Péringuey, 1904
  - Schizonycha sansibarica Kolbe, 1895
  - Schizonycha scabiosa Péringuey, 1904
  - Schizonycha schoutedeni Moser, 1914
  - Schizonycha scorteccii Decelle, 1982
  - Schizonycha setosipennis Moser, 1917
  - Schizonycha seydeli Burgeon, 1946
  - Schizonycha simillima Brenske, 1899
  - Schizonycha singhalensis Brenske, 1900
  - Schizonycha sinuaticeps Moser, 1924
  - Schizonycha spectabilis Péringuey, 1904
  - Schizonycha spiniventris Moser, 1914
  - Schizonycha spuria Péringuey, 1904
  - Schizonycha squamifera Wallengren, 1881
  - Schizonycha squamosa Raffray, 1877
  - Schizonycha squamosetosa Moser, 1921
  - Schizonycha squamulata Brenske, 1895
  - Schizonycha squamulifera Moser, 1924
  - Schizonycha squamulosa Moser, 1914
  - Schizonycha stenolepis Moser, 1914
  - Schizonycha stigmatica Brenske, 1898
  - Schizonycha subrugicollis Moser, 1921
  - Schizonycha subrugipennis Moser, 1914
  - Schizonycha suturalis Moser, 1914
  - Schizonycha tangana Moser, 1917
  - Schizonycha tenebrosa Fairmaire, 1887
  - Schizonycha testacea Moser, 1917
  - Schizonycha testaceipennis Moser, 1918
  - Schizonycha togoana Brenske, 1898
  - Schizonycha transvaalica Péringuey, 1904
  - Schizonycha trichostetha Moser, 1914
  - Schizonycha tuberculiventris Moser, 1914
  - Schizonycha tumida (Laporte, 1840)
  - Schizonycha uelleana Brenske, 1899
  - Schizonycha ufiomica Moser, 1919
  - Schizonycha ugandensis Moser, 1914
  - Schizonycha ukerewia Kolbe, 1913
  - Schizonycha unicolor (Herbst, 1790)
  - Schizonycha urundiensis Burgeon, 1946
  - Schizonycha usambarae Brenske, 1898
  - Schizonycha usambarica Moser, 1914
  - Schizonycha usaramae Brenske, 1898
  - Schizonycha valida Boheman, 1857
  - Schizonycha valvata Brenske, 1898
  - Schizonycha variolicollis Fairmaire, 1884
  - Schizonycha vastatrix Chiaromonte, 1934
  - Schizonycha verruciventris Moser, 1914
  - Schizonycha verrucosa Moser, 1914
  - Schizonycha vethi Moser, 1917
  - Schizonycha vicaria Kolbe, 1895
  - Schizonycha villosa Brenske, 1898
  - Schizonycha vryburgensis Pope, 1960
  - Schizonycha wellmani Moser, 1918
  - Schizonycha windhoekensis Pope, 1960
  - Schizonycha xanthodera Blanchard, 1851
  - Schizonycha zavattarii Gridelli, 1939

== Selected former species ==
- Schizonycha immixta Péringuey, 1904
