= Schizonycha gracilis =

Scientific classification
- Kingdom: Animalia
- Phylum: Arthropoda
- Clade: Pancrustacea
- Class: Insecta
- Order: Coleoptera
- Suborder: Polyphaga
- Infraorder: Scarabaeiformia
- Family: Scarabaeidae
- Genus: Schizonycha
- Species: S. gracilis

Binomial name
- Schizonycha gracilis Brenske, 1898

Synonyms
- Schizonycha imparilis Moser, 1914; Schizonycha paupercula Péringuey, 1904; Schizonycha microps Brenske, 1898

Species of beetle

Schizonycha gracilis is a species of beetle of the family Scarabaeidae. It is found in the Democratic Republic of the Congo, Tanzania and Zimbabwe.

== Description ==
Adults reach a length of about 11–12.5 mm (0.43–0.49 in). They are pale testaceous. The lateral borders of the pronotum have outstanding setae and are less closely and less deeply crenulate along the anterior halves than elsewhere. There are some impunctate areas on the surface. The elytra have punctures which are separated by less than their diameter. The punctures have small, squamiform setae.
