= Schizonycha jordani =

Scientific classification
- Kingdom: Animalia
- Phylum: Arthropoda
- Clade: Pancrustacea
- Class: Insecta
- Order: Coleoptera
- Suborder: Polyphaga
- Infraorder: Scarabaeiformia
- Family: Scarabaeidae
- Genus: Schizonycha
- Species: S. jordani

Binomial name
- Schizonycha jordani Pope, 1960

Species of beetle

Schizonycha jordani is a species of beetle of the family Scarabaeidae. It is found in Namibia.

== Description ==
Adults reach a length of about 11.5–13 mm (0.45–0.51 in). They are testaceous with head and pronotum darker.
