= Schizonycha matabelena =

Scientific classification
- Kingdom: Animalia
- Phylum: Arthropoda
- Clade: Pancrustacea
- Class: Insecta
- Order: Coleoptera
- Suborder: Polyphaga
- Infraorder: Scarabaeiformia
- Family: Scarabaeidae
- Genus: Schizonycha
- Species: S. matabelena

Binomial name
- Schizonycha matabelena Péringuey, 1908

Species of beetle

Schizonycha matabelena is a species of beetle of the family Scarabaeidae. It is found in Zimbabwe.

== Description ==
Adults reach a length of about 9 mm (0.35 in). They are pale testaceous, with the elytra sub-stramineous. The surface of the clypeus is covered with somewhat asperous punctures, that of the head with plain granules separated by an interval broader than their own size. The pronotum is plainly and closely serrulate laterally, covered for two-thirds of the length with slightly asperous or umbilicate punctures separated by an interval equal to their own diameter, and bearing each a minute greyish white hair, in the median posterior part these punctures are not so closely set, and the border over the marginal part of the base is smooth. The scutellum is sparingly punctate and the elytra are covered with umbilicate setigerous punctures separated by an interval equal to their own diameter. The pygidium is more closely punctate than the elytra.
