= Schizonycha villosa =

Scientific classification
- Kingdom: Animalia
- Phylum: Arthropoda
- Clade: Pancrustacea
- Class: Insecta
- Order: Coleoptera
- Suborder: Polyphaga
- Infraorder: Scarabaeiformia
- Family: Scarabaeidae
- Genus: Schizonycha
- Species: S. villosa

Binomial name
- Schizonycha villosa Brenske, 1898

Species of beetle

Schizonycha villosa is a species of beetle of the family Scarabaeidae. It is found in South Africa (KwaZulu-Natal).

== Description ==
Adults reach a length of about 11 mm (0.43 in). They are brick-red and shining, with the pronotum a little redder than the elytra. The surface of the head, with the exception of the base, is covered with cicatricose punctures, which are somewhat asperous in the frontal part. The pronotum is covered with round punctures, which are somewhat irregularly scattered in the discoidal part, but set nearer to each other on the sides, the outer margin is very slightly crenulate, and the hairs are somewhat long. The scutellum is pluri-punctate on each side and the elytra have deep punctures each bearing a minute greyish hair. The pygidium only has a few scattered round punctures.
