= Schizonycha spiniventris =

Scientific classification
- Kingdom: Animalia
- Phylum: Arthropoda
- Clade: Pancrustacea
- Class: Insecta
- Order: Coleoptera
- Suborder: Polyphaga
- Infraorder: Scarabaeiformia
- Family: Scarabaeidae
- Genus: Schizonycha
- Species: S. spiniventris

Binomial name
- Schizonycha spiniventris Moser, 1914

Species of beetle

Schizonycha spiniventris is a species of beetle of the family Scarabaeidae. It is found in Kenya.

== Description ==
Adults reach a length of about 13 mm (0.51 in). They have an elongated, narrow body. The head is somewhat wrinkled and punctate, the anterior margin of the clypeus is not emarginate. The pronotum is about half as wide at the base as it is long, arched behind the middle, the lateral margins are weakly notched, the anterior and posterior angles are obtuse. The surface is sparsely punctate posteriorly, becoming more narrowly punctate towards the anterior margin. The punctures bear minute setae. There are a few punctures laterally on the scutellum. The weakly wrinkled elytra are densely punctate, the punctures bearing small scale-like setae. The pygidium is strongly convex, rather sparsely punctate, the punctures bearing setae which become hair-like towards the posterior margin. The thorax, episterna, and hind coxae are rather densely punctate, but there is a smooth patch on each side of the thorax. The punctures have white bristle-like scales, which are more bristle-like on the middle of the thorax and more scale-like on the other parts. On the abdomen, the punctures bear white setae. On the middle of the third abdominal segment, there is a strong, projecting spine.
