= Schizonycha longa =

Scientific classification
- Kingdom: Animalia
- Phylum: Arthropoda
- Clade: Pancrustacea
- Class: Insecta
- Order: Coleoptera
- Suborder: Polyphaga
- Infraorder: Scarabaeiformia
- Family: Scarabaeidae
- Genus: Schizonycha
- Species: S. longa

Binomial name
- Schizonycha longa Moser, 1917

Species of beetle

Schizonycha longa is a species of beetle of the family Scarabaeidae. It is found in Tanzania.

== Description ==
Adults reach a length of about 13 mm. They are yellowish-brown, but the head and pronotum are reddish. The head is punctate. The pronotum is sparsely and irregularly punctate, behind the anterior margin the punctures are denser. The elytra are punctured, the punctures with tiny setae.
