= Schizonycha graueri =

Scientific classification
- Kingdom: Animalia
- Phylum: Arthropoda
- Clade: Pancrustacea
- Class: Insecta
- Order: Coleoptera
- Suborder: Polyphaga
- Infraorder: Scarabaeiformia
- Family: Scarabaeidae
- Genus: Schizonycha
- Species: S. graueri

Binomial name
- Schizonycha graueri Moser, 1918

Species of beetle

Schizonycha graueri is a species of beetle of the family Scarabaeidae. It is found in Uganda.

== Description ==
Adults reach a length of about 14 mm. They are yellowish-brown, with the head, pronotum and scutellum darker. The head is punctured. The punctures on the pronotum are quite widely spaced in the middle, becoming closer together towards the sides. The punctures have distinct small, light-colored scale-like setae. The elytra are also punctured, the punctures with tiny scales, which, however, become somewhat larger towards the sides.
