= Schizonycha saginata =

Scientific classification
- Kingdom: Animalia
- Phylum: Arthropoda
- Clade: Pancrustacea
- Class: Insecta
- Order: Coleoptera
- Suborder: Polyphaga
- Infraorder: Scarabaeiformia
- Family: Scarabaeidae
- Genus: Schizonycha
- Species: S. saginata

Binomial name
- Schizonycha saginata Péringuey, 1904

Species of beetle

Schizonycha saginata is a species of beetle of the family Scarabaeidae. It is found in South Africa (Northern Cape).

== Description ==
Adults reach a length of about 13 mm (0.51 in). They are black, with the legs piceous, the tarsi brown and the antennae and palpi ferruginous. The surface of the whole head is covered with coarse rugose punctures. The pronotum is fringed with long, closely set fulvous setae and scabrose except for a somewhat faint smooth median longitudinal band. The scutellum has only one puncture on each side of the apical part. The elytra are fringed with long, somewhat scattered fulvous hairs from the humeral angle to about one-third of the length, and then with a thick band of shorter ones. They are covered with closely set punctures enclosing a minute granule and bearing a short, decumbent squamose and somewhat long greyish-white hair. The pygidium has somewhat deep, round, scattered punctures.
