= Schizonycha hahoensis =

Scientific classification
- Kingdom: Animalia
- Phylum: Arthropoda
- Clade: Pancrustacea
- Class: Insecta
- Order: Coleoptera
- Suborder: Polyphaga
- Infraorder: Scarabaeiformia
- Family: Scarabaeidae
- Genus: Schizonycha
- Species: S. hahoensis

Binomial name
- Schizonycha hahoensis Brenske, 1898

Species of beetle

Schizonycha hahoensis is a species of beetle of the family Scarabaeidae. It is found in Togo.

== Description ==
Adults reach a length of about 8.5 mm (0.33 in) for males and 10.5 mm (0.41 in) for females. They have a slim body, with the hairs somewhat more pronounced on the upper surface, especially at the tip of the elytra. The pronotum has white hairs protruding clearly from some less sharp punctures. The suture of the elytra is slightly impressed behind the scutellum. The punctation is dense and slightly wrinkled. The pygidium is much more coarsely punctured. The abdomen is sparsely and minutely haired only on the sides.
