= Schizonycha methneri =

Scientific classification
- Kingdom: Animalia
- Phylum: Arthropoda
- Clade: Pancrustacea
- Class: Insecta
- Order: Coleoptera
- Suborder: Polyphaga
- Infraorder: Scarabaeiformia
- Family: Scarabaeidae
- Genus: Schizonycha
- Species: S. methneri

Binomial name
- Schizonycha methneri Moser, 1914

Species of beetle

Schizonycha methneri is a species of beetle of the family Scarabaeidae. It is found in Tanzania.

== Description ==
Adults reach a length of about 13–14 mm (0.51–0.55 in). They are similar to Schizonycha bicolor in colour and shape, but they are somewhat smaller and differs in the altered covering of the thorax. The frons is transversely wrinkled, punctate, and sparsely covered with narrow scales. The clypeus keel is slightly curved forward, the clypeus is weakly longitudinally wrinkled, the anterior margin shows hardly a trace of a bulge. The pronotum is significantly more densely punctate than in bicolor and weakly transversely wrinkled. The punctures bear distinct small, whitish scales. The transverse ridge on both sides before the posterior margin is more or less smooth. The scutellum is sparsely punctate with a smooth center. On the slightly transversely wrinkled elytra, the punctures are moderately dense and bear small, narrow scales. The pygidium is extensively covered with tiny, scaled umbilical punctures.
