= Schizonycha laticia =

Scientific classification
- Kingdom: Animalia
- Phylum: Arthropoda
- Clade: Pancrustacea
- Class: Insecta
- Order: Coleoptera
- Suborder: Polyphaga
- Infraorder: Scarabaeiformia
- Family: Scarabaeidae
- Genus: Schizonycha
- Species: S. laticia

Binomial name
- Schizonycha laticia Pope, 1960

Species of beetle

Schizonycha laticia is a species of beetle of the family Scarabaeidae. It is found in South Africa (Western Cape, Eastern Cape).

== Description ==
Adults reach a length of about 14.5–16 mm (0.57–0.63 in). They are very similar to Schizonycha ciliata, but the median longitudinal clypeal carina is much shorter and the anterior border of the pronotum is less strongly sinuate laterally.
