= Schizonycha pseudosquamifera =

Scientific classification
- Kingdom: Animalia
- Phylum: Arthropoda
- Clade: Pancrustacea
- Class: Insecta
- Order: Coleoptera
- Suborder: Polyphaga
- Infraorder: Scarabaeiformia
- Family: Scarabaeidae
- Genus: Schizonycha
- Species: S. pseudosquamifera

Binomial name
- Schizonycha pseudosquamifera Pope, 1960

Species of beetle

Schizonycha pseudosquamifera is a species of beetle of the family Scarabaeidae. It is found in South Africa (Eastern Cape, Free State).

== Description ==
Adults reach a length of about 13 mm (0.51 in). They are black to piceous. The pronotum has two narrow, subbasal, impunctate areas, one on either side of the midline and the punctures of the disc and margins are coarse, each with a squamiform seta. The elytra also has punctures with squamiform setae.
