= Schizonycha abrupta =

Scientific classification
- Kingdom: Animalia
- Phylum: Arthropoda
- Clade: Pancrustacea
- Class: Insecta
- Order: Coleoptera
- Suborder: Polyphaga
- Infraorder: Scarabaeiformia
- Family: Scarabaeidae
- Genus: Schizonycha
- Species: S. abrupta

Binomial name
- Schizonycha abrupta Pope, 1960

Species of beetle

Schizonycha abrupta is a species of beetle of the family Scarabaeidae. It is found in South Africa (Eastern Cape).

== Description ==
Adults reach a length of about 16–17 mm (0.63–0.67 in). They are castaneous and somewhat shining, with the head, pronotum and elytra almost unicolorous.
