= Schizonycha parvula =

Scientific classification
- Kingdom: Animalia
- Phylum: Arthropoda
- Clade: Pancrustacea
- Class: Insecta
- Order: Coleoptera
- Suborder: Polyphaga
- Infraorder: Scarabaeiformia
- Family: Scarabaeidae
- Genus: Schizonycha
- Species: S. parvula

Binomial name
- Schizonycha parvula Brenske, 1895

Species of beetle

Schizonycha parvula is a species of beetle of the family Scarabaeidae. It is found in Ethiopia.

== Description ==
Adults reach a length of about 10 mm (0.39 in). They have a rounded clypeus that is sparsely punctate and has a carinate suture and vertex. The thorax is narrowed anteriorly and coarsely, sparsely punctate, and the elytra are coarsely and densely punctate. The pygidium is strongly punctate and the abdomen is covered with small scales.
