= Schizonycha rhodesiana =

Scientific classification
- Kingdom: Animalia
- Phylum: Arthropoda
- Clade: Pancrustacea
- Class: Insecta
- Order: Coleoptera
- Suborder: Polyphaga
- Infraorder: Scarabaeiformia
- Family: Scarabaeidae
- Genus: Schizonycha
- Species: S. rhodesiana

Binomial name
- Schizonycha rhodesiana Moser, 1920

Species of beetle

Schizonycha rhodesiana is a species of beetle of the family Scarabaeidae. It is found in Zimbabwe.

== Description ==
Adults reach a length of about 14 mm (0.55 in). Their color ranges from dull orange to chestnut. The lateral borders of the pronotum are strongly crenulate, and have outstanding setae. There are distinct subbasal impunctate areas on the surface, while the rest is covered with punctures, each with an inverted U-shaped groove and with a small, white seta. The elytra also have punctures with setae, similar to those of the pronotum.
