= Schizonycha stigmatica =

Scientific classification
- Kingdom: Animalia
- Phylum: Arthropoda
- Clade: Pancrustacea
- Class: Insecta
- Order: Coleoptera
- Suborder: Polyphaga
- Infraorder: Scarabaeiformia
- Family: Scarabaeidae
- Genus: Schizonycha
- Species: S. stigmatica

Binomial name
- Schizonycha stigmatica Brenske, 1898

Species of beetle

Schizonycha stigmatica is a species of beetle of the family Scarabaeidae. It is found in the Democratic Republic of the Congo.

== Description ==
Adults reach a length of about 13.5 mm (0.53 in). They have a long and elongated body, with sparse hairs underneath. The pronotum is short, broadly bent anteriorly with slightly rounded front corners. On the unnotched sides, it may curve outwards. It is finely punctate, but not coarsely punctured, without noticeable hairs. The punctures of the elytra are stronger, rounder and without hairs and the setae of the lateral margin are of the same length all the way to the rear. The pygidium is rounded, strongly convex in the middle, very lightly punctured.
