= Schizonycha kabindana =

Scientific classification
- Kingdom: Animalia
- Phylum: Arthropoda
- Clade: Pancrustacea
- Class: Insecta
- Order: Coleoptera
- Suborder: Polyphaga
- Infraorder: Scarabaeiformia
- Family: Scarabaeidae
- Genus: Schizonycha
- Species: S. kabindana

Binomial name
- Schizonycha kabindana Moser, 1924

Species of beetle

Schizonycha kabindana is a species of beetle of the family Scarabaeidae. It is found in the Democratic Republic of the Congo.

== Description ==
Adults reach a length of about 11 mm (0.43 in). They are similar to Schizonycha irangiana. They are yellow and shining, with the head and pronotum more or less reddish.
