= Schizonycha gallana =

Scientific classification
- Kingdom: Animalia
- Phylum: Arthropoda
- Clade: Pancrustacea
- Class: Insecta
- Order: Coleoptera
- Suborder: Polyphaga
- Infraorder: Scarabaeiformia
- Family: Scarabaeidae
- Genus: Schizonycha
- Species: S. gallana

Binomial name
- Schizonycha gallana Brenske, 1895

Species of beetle

Schizonycha gallana is a species of beetle of the family Scarabaeidae. It is found in Ethiopia.

== Description ==
Adults reach a length of about 13 mm (0.51 in). The upper surface of the body is glabrous and not scaly. The clypeus is sinuate and sparsely punctate, with a carinate suture. The frons is loosely punctate and the vertex is finely rugulose and carinate. The thorax is sparsely and deeply punctate, with the sides not crenulate and the scutellum is longitudinally impressed. The elytra are evenly and deeply punctate, while the pygidium is loosely punctate.
