= Schizonycha hecistopsiloides =

Scientific classification
- Kingdom: Animalia
- Phylum: Arthropoda
- Clade: Pancrustacea
- Class: Insecta
- Order: Coleoptera
- Suborder: Polyphaga
- Infraorder: Scarabaeiformia
- Family: Scarabaeidae
- Genus: Schizonycha
- Species: S. hecistopsiloides

Binomial name
- Schizonycha hecistopsiloides Brenske, 1898

Species of beetle

Schizonycha hecistopsiloides is a species of beetle of the family Scarabaeidae. It is found in Tanzania and the Democratic Republic of the Congo.

== Description ==
Adults reach a length of about 16 mm (0.63 in). They have a long, yellowish body, with the head and pronotum reddish. They are hairy below, and finely covered with white scales or setae above. At the tip of the second tarsal segment of the forefeet is an (approximately 1 mm (0.039 in) long) inwardly directed, somewhat curved, pointed, more band-shaped than thorn-shaped process, which bears the same hairs on its outer side as the sole. Since the same formation is present on both feet, it can only be considered a very pronounced sexual characteristic.
