= Schizonycha infarsa =

Scientific classification
- Kingdom: Animalia
- Phylum: Arthropoda
- Clade: Pancrustacea
- Class: Insecta
- Order: Coleoptera
- Suborder: Polyphaga
- Infraorder: Scarabaeiformia
- Family: Scarabaeidae
- Genus: Schizonycha
- Species: S. infarsa

Binomial name
- Schizonycha infarsa Péringuey, 1904

Species of beetle

Schizonycha infarsa is a species of beetle of the family Scarabaeidae. It is found in South Africa (Mpumalanga).

== Description ==
Adults reach a length of about 17 mm (0.67 in). They are dark chestnut-brown and shining, with the tibiae and tarsi piceous-red and the antennae and palpi ferruginous. The pronotum has a fringe of somewhat long and not closely set setae along the outer margin, and is covered with deep round punctures, enclosing a smaller pit, these punctures are more closely set along the sides, where they coalesce and become almost scrobiculate, but the discoidal ones are separated from each other, are somewhat irregularly scattered, and are divided by a space somewhat wider than their own diameter, the basal margin is not fringed with hairs. The scutellum has two somewhat irregular lateral rows of punctures and the elytra are covered with moderately shallow punctures, somewhat closely set yet separated from each other by a space equal to their own diameter, and bearing each a most minute hair. The edge of the propygidium is closely punctulate and the pygidium is covered with deep, round, closely set punctures.
