= Schizonycha loandana =

Scientific classification
- Kingdom: Animalia
- Phylum: Arthropoda
- Clade: Pancrustacea
- Class: Insecta
- Order: Coleoptera
- Suborder: Polyphaga
- Infraorder: Scarabaeiformia
- Family: Scarabaeidae
- Genus: Schizonycha
- Species: S. loandana

Binomial name
- Schizonycha loandana Moser, 1918

Species of beetle

Schizonycha loandana is a species of beetle of the family Scarabaeidae. It is found in Angola.

== Description ==
Adults reach a length of about 13–14 mm. They are brown, with the head, pronotum and scutellum reddish-brown. The head is granularly punctured. The pronotum is moderately densely and irregularly punctate, and the elytra are also punctate.
