= Schizonycha dissensa =

Scientific classification
- Kingdom: Animalia
- Phylum: Arthropoda
- Clade: Pancrustacea
- Class: Insecta
- Order: Coleoptera
- Suborder: Polyphaga
- Infraorder: Scarabaeiformia
- Family: Scarabaeidae
- Genus: Schizonycha
- Species: S. dissensa

Binomial name
- Schizonycha dissensa Péringuey, 1904

Species of beetle

Schizonycha dissensa is a species of beetle of the family Scarabaeidae. It is found in South Africa (Cape).

== Description ==
Adults reach a length of about 13 mm (0.51 in). They are black and not much shining, with the elytra and legs occasionally deep fuscous-brown and with the antennae and palpi piceous-red. The punctures on the upper side bear a very minute greyish hair. The head is small in proportion to the width of the pronotum.
