= Schizonycha angolensis =

Scientific classification
- Kingdom: Animalia
- Phylum: Arthropoda
- Clade: Pancrustacea
- Class: Insecta
- Order: Coleoptera
- Suborder: Polyphaga
- Infraorder: Scarabaeiformia
- Family: Scarabaeidae
- Genus: Schizonycha
- Species: S. angolensis

Binomial name
- Schizonycha angolensis Moser, 1916

Species of beetle

Schizonycha angolensis is a species of beetle of the family Scarabaeidae. It is found in Angola.

== Description ==
Adults reach a length of about 15 mm. They have reddish-yellow antennae. The pronotum is quite sparsely covered with tiny setae and the lateral margins are hairy and slightly notched. The scutellum is sparsely punctate and the elytra are very slightly wrinkled and quite densely punctate. The punctures have tiny setae.
