= Schizonycha filiola =

Scientific classification
- Kingdom: Animalia
- Phylum: Arthropoda
- Clade: Pancrustacea
- Class: Insecta
- Order: Coleoptera
- Suborder: Polyphaga
- Infraorder: Scarabaeiformia
- Family: Scarabaeidae
- Genus: Schizonycha
- Species: S. filiola

Binomial name
- Schizonycha filiola Moser, 1917

Species of beetle

Schizonycha filiola is a species of beetle of the family Scarabaeidae. It is found in South Africa (KwaZulu-Natal).

== Description ==
Adults reach a length of about 9-9.5 mm. They are yellowish-brown, with the head, pronotum, and scutellum reddish-brown. The head is granularly punctate, the punctures with minute scale-like setae. The lateral margins of the pronotum are weakly notched and fringed and the surface is moderately densely and irregularly covered with strong punctures, which are minutely bristled. The elytra are punctate, the punctures with minute scale-like setae. The underside has only very few punctures in the middle.
