= Schizonycha squamosetosa =

Scientific classification
- Kingdom: Animalia
- Phylum: Arthropoda
- Clade: Pancrustacea
- Class: Insecta
- Order: Coleoptera
- Suborder: Polyphaga
- Infraorder: Scarabaeiformia
- Family: Scarabaeidae
- Genus: Schizonycha
- Species: S. squamosetosa

Binomial name
- Schizonycha squamosetosa Moser, 1921

Species of beetle

Schizonycha squamosetosa is a species of beetle of the family Scarabaeidae. It is found in South Africa and Zimbabwe.

== Description ==
Adults reach a length of about 10.5–11.5 mm (0.41–0.45 in). They are testaceous. The pronotum has serrate lateral borders with setae. There are well marked impunctate subbasal areas. The punctures on the elytra have squamiform setae and the lateral borders have setae of varying length.
