= Schizonycha rotunda =

Scientific classification
- Kingdom: Animalia
- Phylum: Arthropoda
- Clade: Pancrustacea
- Class: Insecta
- Order: Coleoptera
- Suborder: Polyphaga
- Infraorder: Scarabaeiformia
- Family: Scarabaeidae
- Genus: Schizonycha
- Species: S. rotunda

Binomial name
- Schizonycha rotunda Pope, 1960

Species of beetle

Schizonycha rotunda is a species of beetle of the family Scarabaeidae. It is found in South Africa (Western Cape).

== Description ==
Adults reach a length of about 13–16 mm (0.51–0.63 in). They are black to piceous and with the wings of the females reduced to much less than the length of the metasternum in most specimens.
