= Schizonycha lebidis =

Scientific classification
- Kingdom: Animalia
- Phylum: Arthropoda
- Clade: Pancrustacea
- Class: Insecta
- Order: Coleoptera
- Suborder: Polyphaga
- Infraorder: Scarabaeiformia
- Family: Scarabaeidae
- Genus: Schizonycha
- Species: S. lebidis

Binomial name
- Schizonycha lebidis Pope, 1960

Species of beetle

Schizonycha lebidis is a species of beetle of the family Scarabaeidae. It is found in South Africa (Eastern Cape).

== Description ==
Adults reach a length of about 13.5–14.5 mm (0.53–0.57 in). They are pale testaceous with the head and pronotum more reddish.
