= Schizonycha inaequalis =

Scientific classification
- Kingdom: Animalia
- Phylum: Arthropoda
- Clade: Pancrustacea
- Class: Insecta
- Order: Coleoptera
- Suborder: Polyphaga
- Infraorder: Scarabaeiformia
- Family: Scarabaeidae
- Genus: Schizonycha
- Species: S. inaequalis

Binomial name
- Schizonycha inaequalis Moser, 1914

Species of beetle

Schizonycha inaequalis is a species of beetle of the family Scarabaeidae. It is found in the Democratic Republic of the Congo.

== Description ==
Adults reach a length of about 15–17 mm (0.59–0.67 in). They are similar to Schizonycha bomuana, but the claws are much more narrowly cleft at the end, and the terminal tooth is significantly shorter and weaker than the inner tooth. The head is punctured, the clypeus keel is curved forward, and the anterior margin of the clypeus is only very weakly emarginate. The pronotum is of similar shape and sculpture to that of bomuana. The scutellum bears only a few punctures laterally and the elytra are rather densely and strongly punctured, the punctures bearing tiny setae. On the pygidium, the umbilical punctures are rather widely spaced. The thorax, episterna, and hind coxae are covered with yellow hairs.
