= Schizonycha bohemani =

Scientific classification
- Kingdom: Animalia
- Phylum: Arthropoda
- Clade: Pancrustacea
- Class: Insecta
- Order: Coleoptera
- Suborder: Polyphaga
- Infraorder: Scarabaeiformia
- Family: Scarabaeidae
- Genus: Schizonycha
- Species: S. bohemani

Binomial name
- Schizonycha bohemani Pope, 1960

Species of beetle

Schizonycha bohemani is a species of beetle of the family Scarabaeidae. It is found in South Africa (Cape, Free State, Transvaal) and Zimbabwe.

== Description ==
Adults reach a length of about 12–14 mm (0.47–0.55 in). They are pale testaceous with the head and pronotum slightly darker. The pronotum has crescentic punctures, each with a minute seta. The elytra also have punctures with minute setae, as well as stiff, outstanding setae along the lateral borders.
