= Schizonycha abscondita =

Scientific classification
- Kingdom: Animalia
- Phylum: Arthropoda
- Clade: Pancrustacea
- Class: Insecta
- Order: Coleoptera
- Suborder: Polyphaga
- Infraorder: Scarabaeiformia
- Family: Scarabaeidae
- Genus: Schizonycha
- Species: S. abscondita

Binomial name
- Schizonycha abscondita Pope, 1960

Species of beetle

Schizonycha abscondita is a species of beetle of the family Scarabaeidae. It is found in South Africa (Gauteng, North West, Limpopo).

== Description ==
Adults reach a length of about 12–14 mm (0.47–0.55 in). They are castaneous. The pronotum has lateral borders with outstanding rather long setae and the surface has impunctate areas, while there are punctures on the disc and margins, each with a minute, white seta. The elytra have punctures with minute setae.
