= Schizonycha frontalis =

Scientific classification
- Kingdom: Animalia
- Phylum: Arthropoda
- Clade: Pancrustacea
- Class: Insecta
- Order: Coleoptera
- Suborder: Polyphaga
- Infraorder: Scarabaeiformia
- Family: Scarabaeidae
- Genus: Schizonycha
- Species: S. frontalis

Binomial name
- Schizonycha frontalis Moser, 1921

Species of beetle

Schizonycha frontalis is a species of beetle of the family Scarabaeidae. It is found in South Africa (KwaZulu-Natal).

== Description ==
Adults reach a length of about 15–16 mm (0.59–0.63 in). They are brunneo-testaceous with head and pronotum somewhat darker.
