= Schizonycha barda =

Scientific classification
- Kingdom: Animalia
- Phylum: Arthropoda
- Clade: Pancrustacea
- Class: Insecta
- Order: Coleoptera
- Suborder: Polyphaga
- Infraorder: Scarabaeiformia
- Family: Scarabaeidae
- Genus: Schizonycha
- Species: S. barda

Binomial name
- Schizonycha barda Burmeister, 1855

Species of beetle

Schizonycha barda is a species of beetle of the family Scarabaeidae. It is found in South Africa (Eastern Cape, KwaZulu-Natal).

== Description ==
Adults reach a length of about 10.75–13 mm (0.423–0.512 in). They are chestnut or fuscous-brown, sometimes nearly black on the upper side. The club of the antennae, the underside and legs are piceous-brown.
