= Schizonycha chaetolepida =

Scientific classification
- Kingdom: Animalia
- Phylum: Arthropoda
- Clade: Pancrustacea
- Class: Insecta
- Order: Coleoptera
- Suborder: Polyphaga
- Infraorder: Scarabaeiformia
- Family: Scarabaeidae
- Genus: Schizonycha
- Species: S. chaetolepida

Binomial name
- Schizonycha chaetolepida Moser, 1914

Species of beetle

Schizonycha chaetolepida is a species of beetle of the family Scarabaeidae. It is found in Eritrea.

== Description ==
Adults reach a length of about 13 mm (0.51 in). They are similar to Schizonycha abdicta, but the shape of the scales on the underside is different. The head is weakly wrinkled and punctate. The clypeus keel is flatly curved, the anterior margin of the clypeus is weakly emarginate. The pronotum is similarly shaped to that of abdicta. It is rather widely punctate posteriorly, becoming more densely punctate behind the anterior margin. The punctures bear bristle-like scales. The scutellum has a smooth center. The weakly transversely wrinkled elytra are densely punctate, the punctures bearing scale-like setae. The umbilical punctures on the pygidium are quite close together. The punctures on the middle of the thorax are bristled, while there are narrow, lanceolate scales with isolated setae on the sides of the thorax. The episterna and hind coxae are also covered with white, lanceolate scales, though these become somewhat bristle-like on the hind coxae. The abdomen, which is slightly concave, is widely punctured in the middle, more densely on the sides, and the punctures bear white or yellow setae.
