= Schizonycha ertli =

Scientific classification
- Kingdom: Animalia
- Phylum: Arthropoda
- Clade: Pancrustacea
- Class: Insecta
- Order: Coleoptera
- Suborder: Polyphaga
- Infraorder: Scarabaeiformia
- Family: Scarabaeidae
- Genus: Schizonycha
- Species: S. ertli

Binomial name
- Schizonycha ertli Moser, 1919

Species of beetle

Schizonycha ertli is a species of beetle of the family Scarabaeidae. It is found in Tanzania.

== Description ==
Adults reach a length of about 12.5 mm. They are similar to Schizonycha bicolor in colour and shape, but smaller and the anterior margin of the clypeus is not indented. The clypeus is strongly punctate, its anterior margin is broadly rounded. On the surface of the pronotum, the punctures are very irregular, leaving larger smooth patches in the middle. Behind the anterior margin, the punctures are denser and somewhat granular. The elytra show a very fine, leathery, granular wrinkling, and the setae of the punctures are fine and short. The thorax is sparsely covered with brown hairs.
