= Schizonycha dissimilis =

Scientific classification
- Kingdom: Animalia
- Phylum: Arthropoda
- Clade: Pancrustacea
- Class: Insecta
- Order: Coleoptera
- Suborder: Polyphaga
- Infraorder: Scarabaeiformia
- Family: Scarabaeidae
- Genus: Schizonycha
- Species: S. dissimilis

Binomial name
- Schizonycha dissimilis Péringuey, 1904

Species of beetle

Schizonycha dissimilis is a species of beetle of the family Scarabaeidae. It is found in South Africa (Limpopo).

== Description ==
Adults reach a length of about 11–12.5 mm (0.43–0.49 in). They are chestnut-brown and shining. The hair in the punctures is distinct on the upper and under sides. They have the same shape as Schizonycha consueta, and the punctures of the pronotum are also similar.
