= Schizonycha congoana =

Scientific classification
- Kingdom: Animalia
- Phylum: Arthropoda
- Clade: Pancrustacea
- Class: Insecta
- Order: Coleoptera
- Suborder: Polyphaga
- Infraorder: Scarabaeiformia
- Family: Scarabaeidae
- Genus: Schizonycha
- Species: S. congoana

Binomial name
- Schizonycha congoana Brenske, 1898

Species of beetle

Schizonycha congoana is a species of beetle of the family Scarabaeidae. It is found in the Democratic Republic of the Congo.

== Description ==
Adults reach a length of about 20 mm (0.79 in). They have an elongated and shiny body. The clypeus is smooth, and punctate only laterally. The frons is sparsely and coarsely punctate with short hairs. The pronotum is finely notched laterally, the corners bluntly rounded, very coarsely and widely punctate with short, yellowish setae. The elytra are densely and coarsely punctate with short setae. The pygidium is duller in its punctation.
