= Schizonycha bottegoi =

Scientific classification
- Kingdom: Animalia
- Phylum: Arthropoda
- Clade: Pancrustacea
- Class: Insecta
- Order: Coleoptera
- Suborder: Polyphaga
- Infraorder: Scarabaeiformia
- Family: Scarabaeidae
- Genus: Schizonycha
- Species: S. bottegoi

Binomial name
- Schizonycha bottegoi Brenske, 1895

Species of beetle

Schizonycha bottegoi is a species of beetle of the family Scarabaeidae. It is found in Ethiopia.

== Description ==
Adults reach a length of about 16 mm (0.63 in). The clypeus is early round, densely punctate, and carinate before the suture. The frons is densely punctate and the sides of the thorax are crenulate. The pygidium is sparsely punctate.
