= Schizonycha nairobiensis =

Scientific classification
- Kingdom: Animalia
- Phylum: Arthropoda
- Clade: Pancrustacea
- Class: Insecta
- Order: Coleoptera
- Suborder: Polyphaga
- Infraorder: Scarabaeiformia
- Family: Scarabaeidae
- Genus: Schizonycha
- Species: S. nairobiensis

Binomial name
- Schizonycha nairobiensis Moser, 1914

Species of beetle

Schizonycha nairobiensis is a species of beetle of the family Scarabaeidae. It is found in Kenya.

== Description ==
Adults reach a length of about 16 mm (0.63 in). They are similar to Schizonycha sansibarica, but more robust and with dense, shaggy hairs on the thorax. The head is somewhat wrinkled and punctate, the clypeus keel is quite strongly curved forward, the anterior margin of the clypeus is only very weakly emarginate. The antennae are reddish-brown. The pronotum is almost twice as wide as it is long, quite extensive and irregularly covered with coarse punctures bearing very small scales. The lateral margins are weakly crenate, the anterior and posterior angles are obtuse, the former being shortly rounded. The transverse ridge before the posterior margin is smooth. The scutellum bears some punctures, the center is unpunctate. On the elytra, the punctures are moderately dense and covered with tiny scales. The pygidium is sparsely punctate. The chest, episterna, and hind coxae are densely covered with long, yellow hairs. The middle of the abdomen is almost smooth. On the sides of the abdomen are widely spaced punctures with short setae.
