= Schizonycha wellmani =

Scientific classification
- Kingdom: Animalia
- Phylum: Arthropoda
- Clade: Pancrustacea
- Class: Insecta
- Order: Coleoptera
- Suborder: Polyphaga
- Infraorder: Scarabaeiformia
- Family: Scarabaeidae
- Genus: Schizonycha
- Species: S. wellmani

Binomial name
- Schizonycha wellmani Moser, 1918

Species of beetle

Schizonycha wellmani is a species of beetle of the family Scarabaeidae. It is found in Angola.

== Description ==
Adults reach a length of about 15–16 mm. They are reddish-brown and shiny. The head, pronotum, scutellum and legs are darker and the head is granularly punctate. The antennae are yellowish-brown. The pronotum is rather densely punctate. The punctures have small, pale setae. The elytra are also punctate. These punctures are covered with minute setae.
