= Schizonycha etischizoides =

Scientific classification
- Kingdom: Animalia
- Phylum: Arthropoda
- Clade: Pancrustacea
- Class: Insecta
- Order: Coleoptera
- Suborder: Polyphaga
- Infraorder: Scarabaeiformia
- Family: Scarabaeidae
- Genus: Schizonycha
- Species: S. etischizoides

Binomial name
- Schizonycha etischizoides Moser, 1914

Species of beetle

Schizonycha etischizoides is a species of beetle of the family Scarabaeidae. It is found in the Democratic Republic of the Congo.

== Description ==
Adults reach a length of about 14 mm (0.55 in). The pronotum is similar in shape to that of Schizonycha circularis, but the anterior margin is somewhat more strongly upturned and projecting forward near the anterior angles. The surface punctation is quite dense, with very small, whitish setae that are somewhat longer near the lateral margins. The lateral margins are finely serrated and bear long, yellow setae and the posterior angles are indistinctly rounded, while the anterior angles are obtuse. The scutellum is punctate laterally. The elytral punctation is quite dense, and the punctures bear very small scales. The pygidium, besides exhibiting very fine and dense punctation, displays more or less densely spaced coarser punctures bearing scale-like, whitish setae. The covering of the underside varies among individual specimens. The thorax is either covered only with yellowish hairs, or, in addition to the hairs, white, bristle-like scales are present on its sides.

== Subspecies ==
- Schizonycha etischizoides etischizoides (Democratic Republic of the Congo)
- Schizonycha etischizoides tinanti Burgeon, 1946 (Democratic Republic of the Congo)
