= Schizonycha bicolorata =

Scientific classification
- Kingdom: Animalia
- Phylum: Arthropoda
- Clade: Pancrustacea
- Class: Insecta
- Order: Coleoptera
- Suborder: Polyphaga
- Infraorder: Scarabaeiformia
- Family: Scarabaeidae
- Genus: Schizonycha
- Species: S. bicolorata

Binomial name
- Schizonycha bicolorata Moser, 1917

Species of beetle

Schizonycha bicolorata is a species of beetle of the family Scarabaeidae. It is found in Angola.

== Description ==
Adults reach a length of about 15 mm. They are yellowish-brown, with the head and pronotum red. The head is somewhat granularly punctate, with the punctures being very widely spaced in the middle of the frons. The antennae are brown, with a lighter club. The surface of the pronotum is densely punctured. Each puncture with a tiny seta. The scutellum has only a few fine punctures and the elytra are slightly wrinkled, the punctures with minute setae.
