= Schizonycha jokona =

Scientific classification
- Kingdom: Animalia
- Phylum: Arthropoda
- Clade: Pancrustacea
- Class: Insecta
- Order: Coleoptera
- Suborder: Polyphaga
- Infraorder: Scarabaeiformia
- Family: Scarabaeidae
- Genus: Schizonycha
- Species: S. jokona

Binomial name
- Schizonycha jokona Moser, 1916

Species of beetle

Schizonycha jokona is a species of beetle of the family Scarabaeidae. It is found in Cameroon.

== Description ==
Adults reach a length of about 16–18 mm. They are reddish-yellow, with the head and pronotum darker. The head is roughly punctate. The pronotum is moderately densely and irregularly covered with very short-bristled punctures. The lateral margins are finely notched and pubescent along their entire length. The scutellum is sparsely punctate. The elytra are very slightly wrinkled and rather densely punctate, the punctures with minute setae.
