= Schizonycha debilis =

Scientific classification
- Kingdom: Animalia
- Phylum: Arthropoda
- Clade: Pancrustacea
- Class: Insecta
- Order: Coleoptera
- Suborder: Polyphaga
- Infraorder: Scarabaeiformia
- Family: Scarabaeidae
- Genus: Schizonycha
- Species: S. debilis

Binomial name
- Schizonycha debilis Burmeister, 1855

Synonyms
- Schizonycha caffra Péringuey, 1904; Schizonycha neutra Péringuey, 1904

Species of beetle

Schizonycha debilis is a species of beetle of the family Scarabaeidae. It is found in South Africa (Eastern Cape).

== Description ==
Adults reach a length of about 15–16 mm (0.59–0.63 in). They are testaceous with head and pronotum darker. This species shows strong sexual dimorphism. Females have much reduced wings and a very short antennal club.
