= Schizonycha diredauana =

Scientific classification
- Kingdom: Animalia
- Phylum: Arthropoda
- Clade: Pancrustacea
- Class: Insecta
- Order: Coleoptera
- Suborder: Polyphaga
- Infraorder: Scarabaeiformia
- Family: Scarabaeidae
- Genus: Schizonycha
- Species: S. diredauana

Binomial name
- Schizonycha diredauana Moser, 1917

Species of beetle

Schizonycha diredauana is a species of beetle of the family Scarabaeidae. It is found in Ethiopia.

== Description ==
Adults reach a length of about 15–17 mm. They are reddish-brown and shiny. The frons is rather sparsely punctured and the antennae are brown. The pronotum is slightly wrinkled and irregularly covered with coarse punctures. The scutellum is sparsely punctured. The elytra are weakly wrinkled and moderately densely covered with punctures, with tiny light setae.
