= Schizonycha tangana =

Scientific classification
- Kingdom: Animalia
- Phylum: Arthropoda
- Clade: Pancrustacea
- Class: Insecta
- Order: Coleoptera
- Suborder: Polyphaga
- Infraorder: Scarabaeiformia
- Family: Scarabaeidae
- Genus: Schizonycha
- Species: S. tangana

Binomial name
- Schizonycha tangana Moser, 1917

Species of beetle

Schizonycha tangana is a species of beetle of the family Scarabaeidae. It is found in Kenya and Tanzania.

== Description ==
Adults reach a length of about 9-9.5 mm. They are brownish-yellow, with a red head, pronotum and scutellum. The head is granularly punctate. The pronotum is moderately densely punctate, and the punctures are covered with small scales. The elytra are quite densely covered with minutely bristle-bearing punctures.
