= Schizonycha algoa =

Scientific classification
- Kingdom: Animalia
- Phylum: Arthropoda
- Clade: Pancrustacea
- Class: Insecta
- Order: Coleoptera
- Suborder: Polyphaga
- Infraorder: Scarabaeiformia
- Family: Scarabaeidae
- Genus: Schizonycha
- Species: S. algoa

Binomial name
- Schizonycha algoa Péringuey, 1904

Species of beetle

Schizonycha algoa is a species of beetle of the family Scarabaeidae. It is found in Mozambique.

== Description ==
Adults reach a length of about 14.5 mm (0.57 in). They are very dark chestnut-brown, with the elytra slightly lighter and the antennae ferruginous. The pronotum is covered with closely set foveolate punctures, which are a little smaller on the anterior part and sides than on the posterior part. The scutellum has two rows of punctures impinging on each other. The elytra are covered with deep punctures and the pygidium is deeply and somewhat closely punctured.
