= Schizonycha salisburiana =

Scientific classification
- Kingdom: Animalia
- Phylum: Arthropoda
- Clade: Pancrustacea
- Class: Insecta
- Order: Coleoptera
- Suborder: Polyphaga
- Infraorder: Scarabaeiformia
- Family: Scarabaeidae
- Genus: Schizonycha
- Species: S. salisburiana

Binomial name
- Schizonycha salisburiana Péringuey, 1904

Synonyms
- Atys hypocrita Péringuey, 1904

Species of beetle

Schizonycha salisburiana is a species of beetle of the family Scarabaeidae. It is found in Zimbabwe.

== Description ==
Adults reach a length of about 14–15 mm (0.55–0.59 in). They are light brick-red, with the elytra pale testaceous, the clypeus slightly infuscate and the antennae flavescent. The pronotum is covered with small cicatricose punctures, nearly equi-distant in the centre of the disk in both sexes, and slightly asperous along the anterior margin. The scutellum is punctate and the elytra are covered with equi-distant punctures bearing a minute greyish hair, and separated by a smooth space equal in width to their diameter.
