= Schizonycha tuberculiventris =

Scientific classification
- Kingdom: Animalia
- Phylum: Arthropoda
- Clade: Pancrustacea
- Class: Insecta
- Order: Coleoptera
- Suborder: Polyphaga
- Infraorder: Scarabaeiformia
- Family: Scarabaeidae
- Genus: Schizonycha
- Species: S. tuberculiventris

Binomial name
- Schizonycha tuberculiventris Moser, 1914

Species of beetle

Schizonycha tuberculiventris is a species of beetle of the family Scarabaeidae. It is found in Tanzania.

== Description ==
Adults reach a length of about 17 mm (0.67 in). The head is weakly wrinkled and punctured and the clypeus keel is projecting in the middle and sometimes has a small smooth spot behind its middle. The anterior margin of the clypeus is barely perceptibly emarginate. The pronotum is fairly extensively covered with coarse punctures bearing small setae. The transverse ridge on each side before the posterior margin is smooth but only slightly prominent. The lateral margins are notched. The anterior and posterior angles are weakly obtuse. The scutellum bears only a few punctures. On the slightly transversely wrinkled elytra, the punctures are scarcely denser than on the pronotum but are somewhat fainter. The setae of the spots are only visible under a magnifying glass. The pygidium is widely and weakly punctate, arched at the posterior margin. The thorax is almost smooth in the middle, the sides of the thorax, the episterna, and the hind coxae are widely punctate and bear white bristle-like scales on the spots, some also longer yellow setae. The abdomen shows a transverse row of yellow-bristled spots in the middle of each segment, while the sides are widely covered with white-bristled spots.
