= Schizonycha minor =

Scientific classification
- Kingdom: Animalia
- Phylum: Arthropoda
- Clade: Pancrustacea
- Class: Insecta
- Order: Coleoptera
- Suborder: Polyphaga
- Infraorder: Scarabaeiformia
- Family: Scarabaeidae
- Genus: Schizonycha
- Species: S. minor

Binomial name
- Schizonycha minor Pope, 1960

Species of beetle

Schizonycha minor is a species of beetle of the family Scarabaeidae. It is found in Namibia.

== Description ==
Adults reach a length of about 10 mm (0.39 in). They are piceous red. The surface of the pronotum and the elytra have punctures with small, fine setae.
