= Schizonycha keniana =

Scientific classification
- Kingdom: Animalia
- Phylum: Arthropoda
- Clade: Pancrustacea
- Class: Insecta
- Order: Coleoptera
- Suborder: Polyphaga
- Infraorder: Scarabaeiformia
- Family: Scarabaeidae
- Genus: Schizonycha
- Species: S. keniana

Binomial name
- Schizonycha keniana Moser, 1914

Species of beetle

Schizonycha keniana is a species of beetle of the family Scarabaeidae. It is found in Kenya.

== Description ==
Adults reach a length of about 14 mm (0.55 in). They are similar to Schizonycha sansibarica, but is somewhat narrower and differs in its head structure. The head is punctured, and the clypeus is somewhat longer than in sansibarica, its anterior margin is only very weakly, much weaker than in the latter species, emarginate. The antennae are reddish-brown, with a yellowish-brown club. The pronotum is not quite twice as wide as it is long and widely covered with coarse punctures that are minutely bristled. The ridge on both sides before the posterior margin is smooth but only slightly protruding. The lateral margins are serrated, the anterior and posterior angles are obtuse and indistinctly short-rounded. The scutellum bears only a few punctures. The elytra are weakly transversely wrinkled and densely punctured, the punctures bearing small, white setae. The punctation of the pygidium is of the same density as that of the elytra, but the punctures are somewhat flatter. The thorax is sparsely covered with yellow hairs and white bristles are present in front of the hind angles, as well as on the episterna. The middle of the abdomen is finely and widely punctured. On the sides of the abdomen, the punctures are somewhat closer together, coarser, and bearing yellow, hair-like setae.
