= Schizonycha testaceipennis =

Scientific classification
- Kingdom: Animalia
- Phylum: Arthropoda
- Clade: Pancrustacea
- Class: Insecta
- Order: Coleoptera
- Suborder: Polyphaga
- Infraorder: Scarabaeiformia
- Family: Scarabaeidae
- Genus: Schizonycha
- Species: S. testaceipennis

Binomial name
- Schizonycha testaceipennis Moser, 1918

Species of beetle

Schizonycha testaceipennis is a species of beetle of the family Scarabaeidae. It is found in Uganda.

== Description ==
Adults reach a length of about 14–15 mm. They are yellowish-brown, with the head, pronotum, scutellum and legs reddish. The head is punctured and the antennae are yellowish-brown. The pronotum has setae along the lateral margins. The punctures on the surface are rather scattered but very irregular.
