= Schizonycha nigricornis =

Scientific classification
- Kingdom: Animalia
- Phylum: Arthropoda
- Clade: Pancrustacea
- Class: Insecta
- Order: Coleoptera
- Suborder: Polyphaga
- Infraorder: Scarabaeiformia
- Family: Scarabaeidae
- Genus: Schizonycha
- Species: S. nigricornis

Binomial name
- Schizonycha nigricornis Burmeister, 1855

Species of beetle

Schizonycha nigricornis is a species of beetle of the family Scarabaeidae. It is found in South Africa.

== Description ==
Adults reach a length of about 11.5–13 mm (0.45–0.51 in). They are piceous black and feebly shining.
