= Schizonycha lindiana =

Scientific classification
- Kingdom: Animalia
- Phylum: Arthropoda
- Clade: Pancrustacea
- Class: Insecta
- Order: Coleoptera
- Suborder: Polyphaga
- Infraorder: Scarabaeiformia
- Family: Scarabaeidae
- Genus: Schizonycha
- Species: S. lindiana

Binomial name
- Schizonycha lindiana Brenske, 1898

Species of beetle

Schizonycha lindiana is a species of beetle of the family Scarabaeidae. It is found in Tanzania.

== Description ==
Adults reach a length of about 11 mm (0.43 in). They are light brown. The pronotum is shortened, broad, slightly elongated anteriorly with angular anterior angles, not densely punctate, and with minute hairs. The elytra are densely punctate, and the pygidium is pointed.
