= Schizonycha benguellana =

Scientific classification
- Kingdom: Animalia
- Phylum: Arthropoda
- Clade: Pancrustacea
- Class: Insecta
- Order: Coleoptera
- Suborder: Polyphaga
- Infraorder: Scarabaeiformia
- Family: Scarabaeidae
- Genus: Schizonycha
- Species: S. benguellana

Binomial name
- Schizonycha benguellana Moser, 1918

Species of beetle

Schizonycha benguellana is a species of beetle of the family Scarabaeidae. It is found in Angola.

== Description ==
Adults reach a length of about 17–19 mm. They are yellowish-brown, but the head, pronotum and scutellum are reddish. The head is fairly sparsely punctate and the antennae are yellowish-brown. The pronotum has rather scattered and irregular punctures. The elytra are punctured. The thorax and episterna are densely punctate and covered with yellow hairs.
