= Schizonycha spectabilis =

Scientific classification
- Kingdom: Animalia
- Phylum: Arthropoda
- Clade: Pancrustacea
- Class: Insecta
- Order: Coleoptera
- Suborder: Polyphaga
- Infraorder: Scarabaeiformia
- Family: Scarabaeidae
- Genus: Schizonycha
- Species: S. spectabilis

Binomial name
- Schizonycha spectabilis Péringuey, 1904

Species of beetle

Schizonycha spectabilis is a species of beetle of the family Scarabaeidae. It is found in Zimbabwe.

== Description ==
Adults reach a length of about 18–20 mm (0.71–0.79 in). They are testaceous-red or chestnut-brown and very shiny, with the elytra and abdomen testaceous. The club of the antennae is flavescent. All the punctures on the upper side and the abdomen bear a most minute hair, and the margins of the pronotum, which are strongly serrate, have a fringe of ciliate hairs.
