= Schizonycha iringana =

Scientific classification
- Kingdom: Animalia
- Phylum: Arthropoda
- Clade: Pancrustacea
- Class: Insecta
- Order: Coleoptera
- Suborder: Polyphaga
- Infraorder: Scarabaeiformia
- Family: Scarabaeidae
- Genus: Schizonycha
- Species: S. iringana

Binomial name
- Schizonycha iringana (Moser, 1914)

Synonyms
- Etischiza iringana Moser, 1914

Species of beetle

Schizonycha iringana is a species of beetle of the family Scarabaeidae. It is found in Tanzania.

== Description ==
Adults reach a length of about 10 mm (0.39 in). They are similar to Schizonycha heudelotii. They are of the same shape, but somewhat lighter in colour. The head is more widely punctate than in heudelotii, the anterior margin is likewise not emarginate. The shape and sculpture of the pronotum are the same in both species, but the lateral margins of the pronotum are barely crenate. The punctation is widely spaced in the posterior part and becomes narrower towards the anterior margin. The transverse ridge on each side before the base is smooth. The scutellum is punctate except at the apex. On the weakly wrinkled elytra, the punctures are slightly more widely spaced than in heudelotii, the scales of the punctures are also minute, but somewhat larger. The pygidium is covered with umbilical punctures, which are closer together and stronger than in heudelotii. The center of the chest is almost smooth, and the abdomen bears scattered spots. The sides of the chest and abdomen, the episterna, and the hind coxae are rather widely punctate and bear yellowish hairs, which, except for those on the chest, are somewhat bristle-like.
