= Schizonycha dilucida =

Scientific classification
- Kingdom: Animalia
- Phylum: Arthropoda
- Clade: Pancrustacea
- Class: Insecta
- Order: Coleoptera
- Suborder: Polyphaga
- Infraorder: Scarabaeiformia
- Family: Scarabaeidae
- Genus: Schizonycha
- Species: S. dilucida

Binomial name
- Schizonycha dilucida Brenske, 1898

Synonyms
- Schizonycha exacerbans Péringuey, 1904

Species of beetle

Schizonycha dilucida is a species of beetle of the family Scarabaeidae. It is found in Tanzania and Zimbabwe.

== Description ==
Adults reach a length of about 11.5–13 mm (0.45–0.51 in). They are testaceous with head and pronotum darker. The lateral borders of the pronotum have outstanding setae and the surface has impunctate areas. The punctures of the disc each contain an M-shaped groove and a small, white seta. The punctures on the elytra have setae similar to those of the pronotum and the spaces between the punctures are almost smooth. The lateral borders have stiff setae.
