= Schizonycha verruciventris =

Scientific classification
- Kingdom: Animalia
- Phylum: Arthropoda
- Clade: Pancrustacea
- Class: Insecta
- Order: Coleoptera
- Suborder: Polyphaga
- Infraorder: Scarabaeiformia
- Family: Scarabaeidae
- Genus: Schizonycha
- Species: S. verruciventris

Binomial name
- Schizonycha verruciventris Moser, 1914

Species of beetle

Schizonycha verruciventris is a species of beetle of the family Scarabaeidae. It is found in Ethiopia.

== Description ==
Adults reach a length of about 13 mm (0.51 in). They are similar to Schizonycha kristenseni in colouration and shape. The pronotum is unevenly covered with coarse, short-bristled punctures. An indistinct spot in the middle and the transverse ridge on each side before the posterior margin are smooth. The lateral margins are notched, the anterior and posterior angles are obtuse. The scutellum bears several punctures on either side of the middle. The elytra are weakly transversely wrinkled and moderately densely punctate, the punctures bearing tiny scale-like setae. The pygidium is convex, finely shagreened, and widely covered with umbilical punctures. The middle of the thorax is smooth and only in front of the posterior margin is it covered with yellow-bristle-bearing punctures. The sides of the thorax, the episterna, and the hind coxae bear coarse punctures, the setae of which are white and weakly scale-like.
