= Schizonycha russula =

Scientific classification
- Kingdom: Animalia
- Phylum: Arthropoda
- Clade: Pancrustacea
- Class: Insecta
- Order: Coleoptera
- Suborder: Polyphaga
- Infraorder: Scarabaeiformia
- Family: Scarabaeidae
- Genus: Schizonycha
- Species: S. russula

Binomial name
- Schizonycha russula Boheman, 1857

Synonyms
- Schizonycha howickiana Péringuey, 1908

Species of beetle

Schizonycha russula is a species of beetle of the family Scarabaeidae. It is found in South Africa (Gauteng).

== Description ==
Adults reach a length of about 9–12 mm (0.35–0.47 in). They are variable in colour, ranging from pale testaceous to dark castaneous. The wings of the females are much reduced.
