= Schizonycha togoana =

Scientific classification
- Kingdom: Animalia
- Phylum: Arthropoda
- Clade: Pancrustacea
- Class: Insecta
- Order: Coleoptera
- Suborder: Polyphaga
- Infraorder: Scarabaeiformia
- Family: Scarabaeidae
- Genus: Schizonycha
- Species: S. togoana

Binomial name
- Schizonycha togoana Brenske, 1898

Species of beetle

Schizonycha togoana is a species of beetle of the family Scarabaeidae. It is found in Togo.

== Description ==
Adults reach a length of about 14 mm (0.55 in). They are of stocky build. The frons is very densely punctate. The pronotum is toothed on the sides only anteriorly, not posteriorly and the punctures on the surface are very deep, sharply imprinted with minute setae. The elytra are sparsely wrinkled and the pygidium is densely and deeply punctate, and wrinkled in the middle.
