= Schizonycha fraudigera =

Scientific classification
- Kingdom: Animalia
- Phylum: Arthropoda
- Clade: Pancrustacea
- Class: Insecta
- Order: Coleoptera
- Suborder: Polyphaga
- Infraorder: Scarabaeiformia
- Family: Scarabaeidae
- Genus: Schizonycha
- Species: S. fraudigera

Binomial name
- Schizonycha fraudigera Péringuey, 1904

Synonyms
- Schizonycha egens Péringuey, 1904

Species of beetle

Schizonycha fraudigera is a species of beetle of the family Scarabaeidae. It is found in South Africa (Mpumalanga, North West).

== Description ==
Adults reach a length of about 10.5–11 mm (0.41–0.43 in). The colour is variable, ranging from pale testaceous to castaneous. Females are wingless.
