= Schizonycha mediastina =

Scientific classification
- Kingdom: Animalia
- Phylum: Arthropoda
- Clade: Pancrustacea
- Class: Insecta
- Order: Coleoptera
- Suborder: Polyphaga
- Infraorder: Scarabaeiformia
- Family: Scarabaeidae
- Genus: Schizonycha
- Species: S. mediastina

Binomial name
- Schizonycha mediastina Péringuey, 1904

Species of beetle

Schizonycha mediastina is a species of beetle of the family Scarabaeidae. It is found in South Africa (Northern Cape).

== Description ==
Adults reach a length of about 11 mm (0.43 in). They are fuscous, with the elytra chestnut-brown and the antennae and palpi ferruginous. The clypeus and the head (with the exception of the basal part) are covered with very closely set scabrose punctures. The pronotum is closely scabroso-punctate in the interior part and has deeper and somewhat close non-scabrose punctures on the posterior. The outer margin is moderately plainly serrulate. The scutellum is not distinctly punctate and the elytra are covered with deep punctures equally distant from each other and bearing a minute greyish hair. The pygidium is faintly punctulate.
