= Schizonycha castanea =

Scientific classification
- Kingdom: Animalia
- Phylum: Arthropoda
- Clade: Pancrustacea
- Class: Insecta
- Order: Coleoptera
- Suborder: Polyphaga
- Infraorder: Scarabaeiformia
- Family: Scarabaeidae
- Genus: Schizonycha
- Species: S. castanea

Binomial name
- Schizonycha castanea Moser, 1917

Species of beetle

Schizonycha castanea is a species of beetle of the family Scarabaeidae. It is found in Ethiopia.

== Description ==
Adults reach a length of about 11–13 mm. They are reddish-brown and shiny. The forehead is densely punctured and the antennae are brown, with a yellowish-brown club. The lateral margins of the pronotum are slightly notched and fringed with yellow hairs. The surface of the pronotum is moderately densely and irregularly punctate and there is an elongated, unpunctate spot in the middle. The scutellum is sparsely punctured, and the middle is smooth. On the elytra, the punctures are moderately dense and have extremely minute setae, as do the punctures of the pronotum.
