= Schizonycha pilosa =

Scientific classification
- Kingdom: Animalia
- Phylum: Arthropoda
- Clade: Pancrustacea
- Class: Insecta
- Order: Coleoptera
- Suborder: Polyphaga
- Infraorder: Scarabaeiformia
- Family: Scarabaeidae
- Genus: Schizonycha
- Species: S. pilosa

Binomial name
- Schizonycha pilosa Moser, 1914

Species of beetle

Schizonycha pilosa is a species of beetle of the family Scarabaeidae. It is found in Eritrea.

== Description ==
Adults reach a length of about 13 mm (0.51 in). They are similar to Schizonycha rhizotrogoides, but differs by their much more densely punctate pronotum. The head is wrinkled, the clypeus somewhat less punctate, the punctures bearing erect hairs. The clypeus keel is weakly curved forward, the anterior margin of the clypeus is barely perceptibly emarginate. The pronotum is almost twice as wide as it is long and quite densely punctured. The punctures bear long yellow hairs, the transverse ridge on both sides before the posterior margin is indistinct, the lateral margins are weakly crenulated, the anterior and posterior angles are obtuse. The scutellum is covered with hairy punctures, except for a smooth midline. The elytra are somewhat transversely wrinkled, moderately densely punctured, the punctures bear tiny setae except for those in the anterior quarter, which are covered with long yellow hairs. The pygidium is rather sparsely covered with weak punctures, which also bear hairs. The thorax, episterna, and hind coxae are densely pubescent. The abdomen is widely covered with pubescent punctures in the middle, becoming slightly more densely covered with them on the sides.
