= Schizonycha livada =

Scientific classification
- Kingdom: Animalia
- Phylum: Arthropoda
- Clade: Pancrustacea
- Class: Insecta
- Order: Coleoptera
- Suborder: Polyphaga
- Infraorder: Scarabaeiformia
- Family: Scarabaeidae
- Genus: Schizonycha
- Species: S. livada

Binomial name
- Schizonycha livada Pope, 1960

Species of beetle

Schizonycha livada is a species of beetle of the family Scarabaeidae. It is found in Eswatini, Namibia, South Africa (Northern Cape, North West, Gauteng, Limpopo) and Zimbabwe.

== Description ==
Adults reach a length of about 12–20 mm (0.47–0.79 in). The colour varies from pale yellow-testaceous to castaneous or medium brown, with the head and pronotum usually darker than the elytra.
