= Schizonycha macrophylla =

Scientific classification
- Kingdom: Animalia
- Phylum: Arthropoda
- Clade: Pancrustacea
- Class: Insecta
- Order: Coleoptera
- Suborder: Polyphaga
- Infraorder: Scarabaeiformia
- Family: Scarabaeidae
- Genus: Schizonycha
- Species: S. macrophylla

Binomial name
- Schizonycha macrophylla Moser, 1916

Species of beetle

Schizonycha macrophylla is a species of beetle of the family Scarabaeidae. It is found in Uganda.

== Description ==
Adults reach a length of about 13.5 mm. They are reddish-brown and shiny. The head is quite widely punctured and the antennae are brown. The pronotum is slightly wrinkled, with very irregular punctures and slightly notched and setate lateral margins. The scutellum has several punctures and the elytra are weakly wrinkled and covered with punctures with minute setae.
