= Schizonycha valvata =

Scientific classification
- Kingdom: Animalia
- Phylum: Arthropoda
- Clade: Pancrustacea
- Class: Insecta
- Order: Coleoptera
- Suborder: Polyphaga
- Infraorder: Scarabaeiformia
- Family: Scarabaeidae
- Genus: Schizonycha
- Species: S. valvata

Binomial name
- Schizonycha valvata Brenske, 1898

Species of beetle

Schizonycha valvata is a species of beetle of the family Scarabaeidae. It is found in South Africa.

== Description ==
Adults reach a length of about 17.5 mm (0.69 in). They are castaneous with the head and pronotum darker.
