= Schizonycha trichostetha =

Scientific classification
- Kingdom: Animalia
- Phylum: Arthropoda
- Clade: Pancrustacea
- Class: Insecta
- Order: Coleoptera
- Suborder: Polyphaga
- Infraorder: Scarabaeiformia
- Family: Scarabaeidae
- Genus: Schizonycha
- Species: S. trichostetha

Binomial name
- Schizonycha trichostetha Moser, 1914

Species of beetle

Schizonycha trichostetha is a species of beetle of the family Scarabaeidae. It is found in Ethiopia.

== Description ==
Adults reach a length of about 12 mm (0.47 in). They are similar to Schizonycha rhizotrogoides. The frons is wrinkled and punctate, the clypeus keel is weakly curved forward, the clypeus is only sparsely punctured, its anterior margin is barely perceptibly emarginate. The pronotum is sparsely punctate, the punctures on the anterior and posterior margins are pubescent. The scutellum is covered with pubescent punctures. The elytra are weakly transversely wrinkled, moderately densely punctate, the punctures are covered with tiny setae. Only immediately behind the anterior margin of the elytra do some punctures bear hairs. The pygidium is sparsely covered with weak, pubescent umbilical punctures. The thorax, episterna, and hind coxae are covered with long, shaggy hairs. The abdomen bears widely spaced, hairy spots in the middle, and somewhat closer together on the sides.
