= Schizonycha rugosa =

Scientific classification
- Kingdom: Animalia
- Phylum: Arthropoda
- Clade: Pancrustacea
- Class: Insecta
- Order: Coleoptera
- Suborder: Polyphaga
- Infraorder: Scarabaeiformia
- Family: Scarabaeidae
- Genus: Schizonycha
- Species: S. rugosa

Binomial name
- Schizonycha rugosa Brenske, 1898

Synonyms
- Schizonycha indotata Péringuey, 1904

Species of beetle

Schizonycha rugosa is a species of beetle of the family Scarabaeidae. It is found in South Africa (KwaZulu-Natal, Mpumalanga) and Zimbabwe.

== Description ==
Adults reach a length of about 15.5–17 mm (0.61–0.67 in). Their colour varies from pale testaceous to very dark brown, with the head and pronotum in lighter specimens usually darker than the elytra.
