= Schizonycha rufoflava =

Scientific classification
- Kingdom: Animalia
- Phylum: Arthropoda
- Clade: Pancrustacea
- Class: Insecta
- Order: Coleoptera
- Suborder: Polyphaga
- Infraorder: Scarabaeiformia
- Family: Scarabaeidae
- Genus: Schizonycha
- Species: S. rufoflava

Binomial name
- Schizonycha rufoflava Moser, 1914

Species of beetle

Schizonycha rufoflava is a species of beetle of the family Scarabaeidae. It is found in the Democratic Republic of the Congo.

== Description ==
Adults reach a length of about 14 mm (0.55 in). They are very similar to Schizonycha circularis, and most easily distinguished from it by the fact that the first segment of the hind tarsi is distinctly shorter than the second. The head is coarsely punctate, with a somewhat rasp-like appearance. The transverse keel in front of the clypeus suture is distinct, and the anterior margin of the clypeus, unlike that of circularis, is only very weakly emarginate. The pronotum is similar in shape to that of circularis, but not as short and less impressed laterally behind the anterior margin. The punctation is similar to that of circularis, rasp-like behind the anterior margin. The punctures bear tiny setae, somewhat larger at the sides. A smooth midline is indistinctly visible. The anterior and posterior angles of the pronotum are short and rounded. The scutellum bears only a few punctures laterally and the elytra are quite densely punctured, weakly wrinkled, the punctures bearing small bristle-like scales. The pygidium displays, in addition to a fine, leathery sculpture, large, flat, bristle-bearing punctures. The thorax is sparsely covered with yellowish hairs.
