= Schizonycha minima =

Scientific classification
- Kingdom: Animalia
- Phylum: Arthropoda
- Clade: Pancrustacea
- Class: Insecta
- Order: Coleoptera
- Suborder: Polyphaga
- Infraorder: Scarabaeiformia
- Family: Scarabaeidae
- Genus: Schizonycha
- Species: S. minima

Binomial name
- Schizonycha minima Péringuey, 1904

Species of beetle

Schizonycha minima is a species of beetle of the family Scarabaeidae. It is found in Mozambique.

== Description ==
Adults reach a length of about 9 mm (0.35 in). They are dark chestnut-brown, moderately shining, and each puncture above and under with a squamose greyish hair.
