= Schizonycha angolana =

Scientific classification
- Kingdom: Animalia
- Phylum: Arthropoda
- Clade: Pancrustacea
- Class: Insecta
- Order: Coleoptera
- Suborder: Polyphaga
- Infraorder: Scarabaeiformia
- Family: Scarabaeidae
- Genus: Schizonycha
- Species: S. angolana

Binomial name
- Schizonycha angolana Brenske, 1898

Species of beetle

Schizonycha angolana is a species of beetle of the family Scarabaeidae. It is found in Angola.

== Description ==
Adults reach a length of about 15 mm (0.59 in). They are reddish-brown and glossy, with only tiny hairs on the upper surface. The thorax has short, thin hairs, but is smooth in the middle. The pronotum is widely punctate with a smooth middle, blunt hind angles, and a smooth, distinct ridge. The elytra are densely, rather coarsely, and wrinkledly punctate. The pygidium is less coarsely punctate.
