= Schizonycha rodhaini =

Scientific classification
- Kingdom: Animalia
- Phylum: Arthropoda
- Clade: Pancrustacea
- Class: Insecta
- Order: Coleoptera
- Suborder: Polyphaga
- Infraorder: Scarabaeiformia
- Family: Scarabaeidae
- Genus: Schizonycha
- Species: S. rodhaini

Binomial name
- Schizonycha rodhaini Moser, 1924

Species of beetle

Schizonycha rodhaini is a species of beetle of the family Scarabaeidae. It is found in the Democratic Republic of the Congo.

== Description ==
Adults reach a length of about 9 mm (0.35 in). They have an oblong, testaceous body, with the head and pronotum rufous. The head has fine, needle-like punctures and the antennae are reddish-yellow. The pronotum is moderately densely punctate, more densely towards the anterior margin. The elytra are slightly rugose, and covered with moderately close punctures. The pygidium is sparsely punctate.
