= Schizonycha noscitata =

Scientific classification
- Kingdom: Animalia
- Phylum: Arthropoda
- Clade: Pancrustacea
- Class: Insecta
- Order: Coleoptera
- Suborder: Polyphaga
- Infraorder: Scarabaeiformia
- Family: Scarabaeidae
- Genus: Schizonycha
- Species: S. noscitata

Binomial name
- Schizonycha noscitata Péringuey, 1904

Species of beetle

Schizonycha noscitata is a species of beetle of the family Scarabaeidae. It is found in South Africa (Northern Cape).

== Description ==
Adults reach a length of about 17 mm (0.67 in). They are chestnut-brown, with the head and pronotum ferruginous. Each puncture on the upper side bears a whitish, small, yet conspicuous hair, and the cilia along the outer margins of the pronotum and of the anterior part of the elytra are long. The club of the antennae is flavescent.
