= Schizonycha increta =

Scientific classification
- Kingdom: Animalia
- Phylum: Arthropoda
- Clade: Pancrustacea
- Class: Insecta
- Order: Coleoptera
- Suborder: Polyphaga
- Infraorder: Scarabaeiformia
- Family: Scarabaeidae
- Genus: Schizonycha
- Species: S. increta

Binomial name
- Schizonycha increta Péringuey, 1904

Species of beetle

Schizonycha increta is a species of beetle of the family Scarabaeidae. It is found in Mozambique.

== Description ==
Adults reach a length of about 12–13.25 mm (0.472–0.522 in). They have an elongate, pale testaceous body, but the head and pronotum are somewhat brownish, and both covered with closely set, squamiform, greyish hairs springing from the punctures. The elytra have similar hairs, which are not, however, quite so densely set.
