= Schizonycha damarina =

Scientific classification
- Kingdom: Animalia
- Phylum: Arthropoda
- Clade: Pancrustacea
- Class: Insecta
- Order: Coleoptera
- Suborder: Polyphaga
- Infraorder: Scarabaeiformia
- Family: Scarabaeidae
- Genus: Schizonycha
- Species: S. damarina

Binomial name
- Schizonycha damarina Péringuey, 1908

Species of beetle

Schizonycha damarina is a species of beetle of the family Scarabaeidae. It is found in Namibia.

== Description ==
Adults reach a length of about 16.5 mm (0.65 in). The head and pronotum are brick-red and the elytra are pale straw colour. The pygidium and abdomen are fuscous. The central part of the pronotum is covered with nearly contiguous variolose punctures, and the sides and anterior part with equally closely asperous ones, from the centre of the disk to the base runs a longitudinal smooth line, and the supra-basal fold is not quite smooth. The scutellum is closely punctate laterally and the elytra are covered with simple punctures separated by an interval equal to their own diameter. The pygidium is finely but not closely punctate.
