= Schizonycha inedita =

Scientific classification
- Kingdom: Animalia
- Phylum: Arthropoda
- Clade: Pancrustacea
- Class: Insecta
- Order: Coleoptera
- Suborder: Polyphaga
- Infraorder: Scarabaeiformia
- Family: Scarabaeidae
- Genus: Schizonycha
- Species: S. inedita

Binomial name
- Schizonycha inedita Péringuey, 1904

Species of beetle

Schizonycha inedita is a species of beetle of the family Scarabaeidae. It is found in Namibia.

== Description ==
Adults reach a length of about 12 mm (0.47 in). They are brick-red, with the elytra not paler than the rest of the body. The clypeus is covered with asperous punctures and the pronotum has a plainly serrate outer margin and has a fringe of long setulose hairs, the sculpture consists of deep, round punctures very briefly setigerous, more cicatricose in the anterior than in the posterior part, but more closely set on the sides than on the middle of the disk. The scutellum has two lateral punctures on each side near the base. The elytra are covered with slightly elongate punctures bearing each a very minute hair, and divided from each other by a space equal to twice their own diameter.
