= Schizonycha usambarae =

Scientific classification
- Kingdom: Animalia
- Phylum: Arthropoda
- Clade: Pancrustacea
- Class: Insecta
- Order: Coleoptera
- Suborder: Polyphaga
- Infraorder: Scarabaeiformia
- Family: Scarabaeidae
- Genus: Schizonycha
- Species: S. usambarae

Binomial name
- Schizonycha usambarae Brenske, 1898

Synonyms
- Schizonycha bogamoyana Brenske, 1898

Species of beetle

Schizonycha usambarae is a species of beetle of the family Scarabaeidae. It is found in South Africa (Gauteng, Mpumalanga, North West), Zimbabwe, Mozambique and Tanzania.

== Description ==
Adults reach a length of about 13–16 mm (0.51–0.63 in). They are variable in colour, ranging from testaceous to deep fuscous. The pronotum has lateral borders with outstanding setae and the surface has punctures with small, white setae and impunctate areas. The elytra also have punctures with setae.
