= Schizonycha ovampoana =

Scientific classification
- Kingdom: Animalia
- Phylum: Arthropoda
- Clade: Pancrustacea
- Class: Insecta
- Order: Coleoptera
- Suborder: Polyphaga
- Infraorder: Scarabaeiformia
- Family: Scarabaeidae
- Genus: Schizonycha
- Species: S. ovampoana

Binomial name
- Schizonycha ovampoana Péringuey, 1904

Species of beetle

Schizonycha ovampoana is a species of beetle of the family Scarabaeidae. It is found in Namibia.

== Description ==
Adults reach a length of about 20 mm (0.79 in). They are testaceous, with the elytra somewhat paler than the pronotum and the head darker. The palpi and antennae are somewhat ferruginous. The pronotum is moderately densely villose along the outer margin and the surface is covered with deep, sub-foveolate punctures. In the centre there is a somewhat plain, smooth line having the appearance of being slightly raised. The scutellum has a marginal row of deep punctures, a basal one, and two or three punctures transversely set. The elytra are deeply punctured with the intervals non-coriaceous, and the hairs in the punctures extremely small. The pygidium is covered with moderately deep, sub-cicatricose, equally distant punctures separated from each other by a space equal to their diameter.
