= Schizonycha lukulediana =

Scientific classification
- Kingdom: Animalia
- Phylum: Arthropoda
- Clade: Pancrustacea
- Class: Insecta
- Order: Coleoptera
- Suborder: Polyphaga
- Infraorder: Scarabaeiformia
- Family: Scarabaeidae
- Genus: Schizonycha
- Species: S. lukulediana

Binomial name
- Schizonycha lukulediana Moser, 1917

Species of beetle

Schizonycha lukulediana is a species of beetle of the family Scarabaeidae. It is found in Tanzania.

== Description ==
Adults reach a length of about 14 mm. They are yellowish-brown, while the head, pronotum, scutellum and legs are reddish-brown. The frons is punctured and the punctures have bristle-like scales. The antennae are reddish-brown, with a yellowish-brown club. The pronotum is punctured and the lateral margins are weakly notched and fringed with yellow cilia. The scutellum is sparsely punctured and the elytra are transversely wrinkled and have punctures, covered with small elongated scales.
