= Schizonycha windhoekensis =

Scientific classification
- Kingdom: Animalia
- Phylum: Arthropoda
- Clade: Pancrustacea
- Class: Insecta
- Order: Coleoptera
- Suborder: Polyphaga
- Infraorder: Scarabaeiformia
- Family: Scarabaeidae
- Genus: Schizonycha
- Species: S. windhoekensis

Binomial name
- Schizonycha windhoekensis Pope, 1960

Species of beetle

Schizonycha windhoekensis is a species of beetle of the family Scarabaeidae. It is found in Namibia.

== Description ==
Adults reach a length of about 11–11.5 mm (0.43–0.45 in). They are pale to medium testaceous with the head and pronotum usually a little more red in colour.
