= Schizonycha insuesa =

Scientific classification
- Kingdom: Animalia
- Phylum: Arthropoda
- Clade: Pancrustacea
- Class: Insecta
- Order: Coleoptera
- Suborder: Polyphaga
- Infraorder: Scarabaeiformia
- Family: Scarabaeidae
- Genus: Schizonycha
- Species: S. insuesa

Binomial name
- Schizonycha insuesa Péringuey, 1904

Species of beetle

Schizonycha insuesa is a species of beetle of the family Scarabaeidae. It is found in South Africa.

== Description ==
Adults reach a length of about 12 mm (0.47 in). They are ferruginous. The clypeus and the head are covered with closely set scabrose punctures. The pronotum is very strongly serrate laterally, not very closely scabroso-punctate along the anterior part, and irregularly punctured on the discoidal and posterior part, these punctures are somewhat deep and the intervals between them are slightly raised, the supra-basal transverse fold is very plain. The scutellum is almost impunctate and the elytra are covered with minutely setigerous punctures, somewhat deep and separated from each other by a space wider than their own diameter. The pygidium has small, scattered punctures.
