= Schizonycha elegans =

Scientific classification
- Kingdom: Animalia
- Phylum: Arthropoda
- Clade: Pancrustacea
- Class: Insecta
- Order: Coleoptera
- Suborder: Polyphaga
- Infraorder: Scarabaeiformia
- Family: Scarabaeidae
- Genus: Schizonycha
- Species: S. elegans

Binomial name
- Schizonycha elegans Péringuey, 1904

Species of beetle

Schizonycha elegans is a species of beetle of the family Scarabaeidae. It is found in South Africa (North West) and Mozambique.

== Description ==
Adults reach a length of about 15.5–16.5 mm (0.61–0.65 in). They are rusty-red, with the elytra, abdomen, and club of the antennae testaceous. The pronotum is covered with closely set scabrose punctures in the anterior part, and by slightly broader and more cicatricose ones in the posterior, the latter being divided in the discoidal part by irregular, slightly raised smooth intervals. The scutellum is punctate laterally and the elytra are narrow, very elongate and the punctures are very deep. The pygidium has a few faint lateral punctures and punctures on the sides of the abdomen are numerous, and each have a short greyish hair.
