= Schizonycha flavicornis =

Scientific classification
- Kingdom: Animalia
- Phylum: Arthropoda
- Clade: Pancrustacea
- Class: Insecta
- Order: Coleoptera
- Suborder: Polyphaga
- Infraorder: Scarabaeiformia
- Family: Scarabaeidae
- Genus: Schizonycha
- Species: S. flavicornis

Binomial name
- Schizonycha flavicornis Brenske, 1898

Synonyms
- Schizonycha nigrofusca arabica Arrow, 1944; Schizonycha nigrofusca Arrow, 1900; Schizonycha africana Burmeister, 1855

Species of beetle

Schizonycha flavicornis is a species of beetle of the family Scarabaeidae. It is found in Sudan, Somalia, Saudi Arabia and Ethiopia.

== Description ==
Adults reach a length of about 13.5–19 mm (0.53–0.75 in). They are light brown, very heavily speckled, with the head and thorax darker, the former with three transverse keels, and the latter with a transverse elevation on each side at the rear. The underside has a few very white spots. The antennae are very light.
