= Schizonycha ugandensis =

Scientific classification
- Kingdom: Animalia
- Phylum: Arthropoda
- Clade: Pancrustacea
- Class: Insecta
- Order: Coleoptera
- Suborder: Polyphaga
- Infraorder: Scarabaeiformia
- Family: Scarabaeidae
- Genus: Schizonycha
- Species: S. ugandensis

Binomial name
- Schizonycha ugandensis Moser, 1914

Species of beetle

Schizonycha ugandensis is a species of beetle of the family Scarabaeidae. It is found in Uganda.

== Description ==
Adults reach a length of about 16 mm (0.63 in). They are similar to Schizonycha crenata, but a little smaller. The head is somewhat wrinkled and punctured, the clypeus keel is strong and shallowly curved, the anterior margin is weakly indented. The pronotum is of the same shape as in crenata and similarly sculpted, the punctures bear tiny setae. The scutellum bears several punctures along the sides. The punctures of the elytra are coarse, closely spaced, and have tiny setae and the spaces between the punctures are weakly wrinkled. The pygidium also shows a slight wrinkling and the punctures are somewhat more widely spaced than on the elytra. The thorax, episterna, and hind coxae are rather long but sparsely pubescent.
