= Schizonycha feirana =

Scientific classification
- Kingdom: Animalia
- Phylum: Arthropoda
- Clade: Pancrustacea
- Class: Insecta
- Order: Coleoptera
- Suborder: Polyphaga
- Infraorder: Scarabaeiformia
- Family: Scarabaeidae
- Genus: Schizonycha
- Species: S. feirana

Binomial name
- Schizonycha feirana Péringuey, 1908

Species of beetle

Schizonycha feirana is a species of beetle of the family Scarabaeidae. It is found in Zimbabwe.

== Description ==
Adults reach a length of about 14–14.5 mm (0.55–0.57 in). They are rusty-red or reddish-chestnut and shiny, with the palps and antennae flavescent. The head is slightly darker (except the neck) than the pronotum or elytra. The pronotum is covered with punctures separated by an interval about equal to their diameter, slightly rugose in males, plainly variolose in females, which also have an abbreviated median smooth elongated area, which is absent in males. The smooth supra-basal lateral fold is also more conspicuous in males. The punctures on the elytra are hairless in both sexes.
