= Schizonycha boschimana =

Scientific classification
- Kingdom: Animalia
- Phylum: Arthropoda
- Clade: Pancrustacea
- Class: Insecta
- Order: Coleoptera
- Suborder: Polyphaga
- Infraorder: Scarabaeiformia
- Family: Scarabaeidae
- Genus: Schizonycha
- Species: S. boschimana

Binomial name
- Schizonycha boschimana Péringuey, 1904

Synonyms
- Schizonycha litigiosa Péringuey, 1908

Species of beetle

Schizonycha boschimana is a species of beetle of the family Scarabaeidae. It is found in South Africa (Northern Cape, Limpopo).

== Description ==
Adults reach a length of about 13 mm (0.51 in). They are shining and ferruginous-red, with the elytra a little paler than the head and pronotum. They are glabrous on the upper side, except for a row of not closely set setae along the outer margin of the pronotum and elytra.
