= Schizonycha flavescens =

Scientific classification
- Kingdom: Animalia
- Phylum: Arthropoda
- Clade: Pancrustacea
- Class: Insecta
- Order: Coleoptera
- Suborder: Polyphaga
- Infraorder: Scarabaeiformia
- Family: Scarabaeidae
- Genus: Schizonycha
- Species: S. flavescens

Binomial name
- Schizonycha flavescens Brenske, 1898

Species of beetle

Schizonycha flavescens is a species of beetle of the family Scarabaeidae. It is found in Tanzania.

== Description ==
Adults reach a length of about 17 mm (0.67 in). They are very similar to Schizonycha bicolor. They are light brown, with the head and pronotum reddish. The pronotum is less densely punctate, the punctures are shorter, more transverse, and less deep than in bicolor. The elytra are somewhat smoother, the minute hairs a little more visible. The pygidium is rather densely but dull-punctate.
