= Schizonycha profuga =

Scientific classification
- Kingdom: Animalia
- Phylum: Arthropoda
- Clade: Pancrustacea
- Class: Insecta
- Order: Coleoptera
- Suborder: Polyphaga
- Infraorder: Scarabaeiformia
- Family: Scarabaeidae
- Genus: Schizonycha
- Species: S. profuga

Binomial name
- Schizonycha profuga Péringuey, 1904

Species of beetle

Schizonycha profuga is a species of beetle of the family Scarabaeidae. It is found in Mozambique and Zimbabwe.

== Description ==
Adults reach a length of about 14–16 mm (0.55–0.63 in). The head, pronotum and legs are chestnut or rusty-brown, while the elytra is paler and sometimes testaceous. The antennae and palpi are rusty-red. The pronotum is covered with almost contiguous cicatricose punctures separated by scabrose intervals, except along the base and for a median space above the scutellum where these intervals are not scabrose, and the punctures are less cicatricose. The scutellum pluri-punctate on each side, the punctures more numerous in females than in males. The elytra have punctures that are divided by intervals narrower than their diameter, and somewhat raised in the discoidal part, the hair they bear is minute. The pygidium is covered with closely set foveolate punctures separated by intervals half the size of their diameter.
