= Schizonycha microphylla =

Scientific classification
- Kingdom: Animalia
- Phylum: Arthropoda
- Clade: Pancrustacea
- Class: Insecta
- Order: Coleoptera
- Suborder: Polyphaga
- Infraorder: Scarabaeiformia
- Family: Scarabaeidae
- Genus: Schizonycha
- Species: S. microphylla

Binomial name
- Schizonycha microphylla Moser, 1917

Species of beetle

Schizonycha microphylla is a species of beetle of the family Scarabaeidae. It is found in Kenya.

== Description ==
Adults reach a length of about 10.5 mm. They are yellowish-brown, with the head, pronotum, scutellum and legs red. The head is granularly punctate. The lateral margins of the pronotum are setate, and the surface is quite densely covered with strong punctures with minute scales. The elytra are punctate and covered with minute, bristle-like scales, spaced somewhat further apart than on the pronotum.
