= Schizonycha manicana =

Scientific classification
- Kingdom: Animalia
- Phylum: Arthropoda
- Clade: Pancrustacea
- Class: Insecta
- Order: Coleoptera
- Suborder: Polyphaga
- Infraorder: Scarabaeiformia
- Family: Scarabaeidae
- Genus: Schizonycha
- Species: S. manicana

Binomial name
- Schizonycha manicana Péringuey, 1904

Species of beetle

Schizonycha manicana is a species of beetle of the family Scarabaeidae. It is found in Zimbabwe.

== Description ==
Adults reach a length of about 15.5–16 mm (0.61–0.63 in). The head and pronotum are testaceous-red or sub-ferruginous, while the elytra and abdomen are very pale testaceous and the legs chestnut-brown. The pronotum is covered with cicatricose punctures, smaller, very scabrose and closely set along the anterior part, the punctures in the discoidal part, and reaching as far as the base, are broader, and although slightly irregularly set, are divided by a smooth space nearly equal in width to the diameter of the punctures, and there is in both sexes a longitudinal smooth, raised line in the posterior discoidal part. The hairs on the head and pronotum are very minute, but the fringe of setose hairs along the outer margins of the pronotum is long. The scutellum has two lateral rows of punctures and the elytra are deeply punctured, the punctures bearing each a most minute hair. The intervals are narrower than the punctures, and slightly raised along the sutural part only. The pygidium is covered with closely set, somewhat deep punctures.
