= Schizonycha perforata =

Scientific classification
- Kingdom: Animalia
- Phylum: Arthropoda
- Clade: Pancrustacea
- Class: Insecta
- Order: Coleoptera
- Suborder: Polyphaga
- Infraorder: Scarabaeiformia
- Family: Scarabaeidae
- Genus: Schizonycha
- Species: S. perforata

Binomial name
- Schizonycha perforata Burmeister, 1855

Species of beetle

Schizonycha perforata is a species of beetle of the family Scarabaeidae. It is found in South Africa (Northern Cape).

== Description ==
Adults reach a length of about 19 mm (0.75 in). They are reddish-fuscous and shiny, with the pronotum very densely ruguloso-punctate. The elytra are regularly but less densely punctate.
