= Platychelus gentilis =

Scientific classification
- Kingdom: Animalia
- Phylum: Arthropoda
- Class: Insecta
- Order: Coleoptera
- Suborder: Polyphaga
- Infraorder: Scarabaeiformia
- Family: Scarabaeidae
- Genus: Platychelus
- Species: P. gentilis

Binomial name
- Platychelus gentilis Péringuey, 1902

Species of beetle

Platychelus gentilis is a species of beetle of the family Scarabaeidae. It is found in South Africa (Cape).

== Description ==
Adults reach a length of about 5.5 mm (0.22 in). They are very similar to Platychelus dimidiatus and Platychelus basalis, but at once distinguished by the elytra which are a little more costulate on the discoidal part. The head and pronotum are bronze-green and the elytra are slightly rufescent along the base in the male, but not in the female, and are dark bronze for the greatest part of the length. Also, the pubescence of the pronotum and elytra is much shorter than in P. dimidiatus, but the bands of whitish hairs are similar. The scutellum, propygidium, and abdomen are clothed with dense, squamose, slightly flavescent hairs, which in the female are less squamose and more yellow.
