= Schizonycha kochi =

Scientific classification
- Kingdom: Animalia
- Phylum: Arthropoda
- Clade: Pancrustacea
- Class: Insecta
- Order: Coleoptera
- Suborder: Polyphaga
- Infraorder: Scarabaeiformia
- Family: Scarabaeidae
- Genus: Schizonycha
- Species: S. kochi

Binomial name
- Schizonycha kochi Pope, 1960

Species of beetle

Schizonycha kochi is a species of beetle of the family Scarabaeidae. It is found in South Africa (Gauteng, North West).

== Description ==
Adults reach a length of about 13–14 mm (0.51–0.55 in). They are very similar to Schizonycha mimocontinens and Schizonycha continens, but the punctures of the pronotal disc are usually more widely separated and the colour is generally darker and has a more noticeable red tone.
