= Abacetus pumilus =

Scientific classification
- Kingdom: Animalia
- Phylum: Arthropoda
- Class: Insecta
- Order: Coleoptera
- Suborder: Adephaga
- Family: Carabidae
- Genus: Abacetus
- Species: A. pumilus

Binomial name
- Abacetus pumilus (Boheman, 1848)

Synonyms
- Feronia pumila (Boheman, 1848)

Species of beetle

Abacetus pumilus is a species of ground beetle in the subfamily Pterostichinae. It was described by Boheman in 1848. Abacetus pumilus is a small, but distinctive, beetle with red legs and antennae, and a green tinge on its wings. Very little is known about Abacetus pumilus habitat, however it is found throughout the arid deserts and semi-arid steppes of southern Africa.

== Taxonomy and Phylogeny ==
The species name pumilus is from Latin meaning dwarf, referencing the beetles small size. Abacetus pumilus is closely related to Abacetus pygmaeus.

=== Species key ===
Following the species key developed by L. Peringuey Abacetus pumilus can be identified by:

GROUP. The prothorax is strongly heart shaped and the frontal groove (sulci) is deep and curved like a bow.

Sub-group. Species have a metallic sheen on the upper-side.

Abacus pumilus. The upper surface of the prothorax (pronotum) is broader than long.

== Description ==
=== Size ===
L. Peringuey described the adult beetles as 6mm in length and 2mm in width.

=== Colour and Markings ===
The head and prothorax of the beetle are black, wings (elytra) have a dark green tinge, legs and the three basal joints of the antennae are red.

=== Thorax ===
The prothorax rounded on the side, moderately widened in the middle and suddenly narrowed (but not truncated) at a very short distance from the base. Rear angle sharp and projecting, deeply marked (punctured) at base.

=== Wings ===
Wings (elytra) are not broader than the prothorax, however are elongated and a little depressed, marked with fine parallel lines which are very finely scratched (aciculate). Intervals between the parallel lines are smooth.

== Distribution and habitat ==
Abacetus pumilus has been mainly collected from Namibia with a single collection from near Kwekwe in Zimbabwe. There have also been references to Abacetus pumilus being found in Southern Angola and from the Transkei province in South Africa. However no specific location details are available.

Based on the collection records, Abacetus pumilus is predominately found in both hot and cold arid deserts (BWh, BWk), and hot and cold arid steppes (BSh, BSk).

Abacetus pumilus distribution in Southern Africa
