= Schizonycha neglecta =

Scientific classification
- Kingdom: Animalia
- Phylum: Arthropoda
- Clade: Pancrustacea
- Class: Insecta
- Order: Coleoptera
- Suborder: Polyphaga
- Infraorder: Scarabaeiformia
- Family: Scarabaeidae
- Genus: Schizonycha
- Species: S. neglecta

Binomial name
- Schizonycha neglecta Boheman, 1857

Synonyms
- Schizonycha plausibilis Péringuey, 1904; Schizonycha consueta Péringuey, 1908 (nec. Kolbe)

Species of beetle

Schizonycha neglecta is a species of beetle of the family Scarabaeidae. It is found in South Africa (Eastern Cape, Free State, KwaZulu-Natal, Limpopo), Namibia and Zimbabwe.

== Description ==
Adults reach a length of about 13.5–15 mm (0.53–0.59 in). They are totally fuscous-brown, or with the elytra and abdomen ferruginous. The antennae are brick-red. They are similar in shape and size to Schizonycha continens.
