= Harpalus rufomarginatus =

Scientific classification
- Kingdom: Animalia
- Phylum: Arthropoda
- Class: Insecta
- Order: Coleoptera
- Suborder: Adephaga
- Family: Carabidae
- Genus: Harpalus
- Species: H. rufomarginatus

Binomial name
- Harpalus rufomarginatus (Boheman, 1848)

Species of beetle

Harpalus rufomarginatus is a species of ground beetle in the subfamily Harpalinae. It was described by Boheman in 1848.
