= Trigonorhinus sticticus =

Scientific classification
- Kingdom: Animalia
- Phylum: Arthropoda
- Class: Insecta
- Order: Coleoptera
- Suborder: Polyphaga
- Infraorder: Cucujiformia
- Family: Anthribidae
- Genus: Trigonorhinus
- Species: T. sticticus

Binomial name
- Trigonorhinus sticticus (Boheman, 1833)

Species of beetle

Trigonorhinus sticticus is a species of fungus weevil in the beetle family Anthribidae.
