= Platychelus caffer =

Scientific classification
- Kingdom: Animalia
- Phylum: Arthropoda
- Class: Insecta
- Order: Coleoptera
- Suborder: Polyphaga
- Infraorder: Scarabaeiformia
- Family: Scarabaeidae
- Genus: Platychelus
- Species: P. caffer

Binomial name
- Platychelus caffer (Boheman, 1857)

Synonyms
- Dichelus caffer Boheman, 1857

Species of beetle

Platychelus caffer is a species of beetle of the family Scarabaeidae. It is found in South Africa (Cape, Free State).

== Description ==
Adults reach a length of about 5.5 mm (0.22 in). They are black, with a faint metallic tinge. The elytra have a faint brownish tinge. The head is very rugose and hairy and the pronotum is scabrose in the interior part and sides, punctate in the discoidal posterior part, densely pubescent, with the pubescence long, erect, and greyish. The elytra are deeply and somewhat closely punctate and clothed with an equal, somewhat dense fuscous pubescence. The pygidial part, abdomen, pectus, and hind legs are clothed with a similar pubescence which is not, however, very dense.
