= Abacetus emeritus =

Scientific classification
- Kingdom: Animalia
- Phylum: Arthropoda
- Class: Insecta
- Order: Coleoptera
- Suborder: Adephaga
- Family: Carabidae
- Genus: Abacetus
- Species: A. emeritus

Binomial name
- Abacetus emeritus Peringuey, 1899

Species of beetle

Abacetus emeritus is a species of ground beetle in the subfamily Pterostichinae. It was described by L. Peringuey in 1899. A. emeritus is a small beetle shiny black in colour with reddish mouth feelers and pitchy black legs and antennae. A. emeritus is very rare with only one known published account of collection. Very little is known about its habitat, however it is found in the subtropical highlands of Zimbabwe.

== Taxonomy and Phylogeny ==
The species name emeritus is from latin meaning 'to deserve' or merit. The reason this name was given to the species is unknown but suggests that A. emeritus deserves to belong to the genus Abacetus.

The holotype specimen is a female and was collected by G. A. K. Marshall with the collection date some time in the 1890s. A. emeritus is similar to Abacetus nigrinus.

S. Straneo examined the holotype specimen at the South African Museum in the 1940s. Straneo was unable to examine other specimens of the species as none of the specimens received from Museums and private individuals coincided with the typical specimen.

=== Species Key ===
From the species key developed by L. Peringuey A. emeritus can be identified as follows:

GROUP. Species in which the inner spur of the front tibiae is simple or slightly split.

Sub-group. Species which have antennal joints of normal thickness.

Abacetus emeritus. The prothorax is sub-heart shaped and intervals of wings are moderately raised on the disk.

== Description ==
=== Size ===
L. Peringuey described the sole adult specimen as 9mm in length and 4mm in width.

=== Colour and Markings ===
The beetles are black and shiny, the mouth feelers (palpi) are slightly reddish (sub-rufrescent). The three basal antennal joints and the foot (tarsi) are pitchy black (piceous). Straneo noted that the stripes of the species are perfectly smooth, without any trace of scalloping (crenulation).

=== Legs ===
Inner spur on the shank portion of the leg (tibiae) which when viewed from the front (anterior) is intact (simple) or very slightly split (bifid). The hind tibiae have three grooves (tri-sulcate), and so have the hind and intermediate feet (tarsi).

=== Thorax ===
The first thoracic segment (Prothorax), which is the segment closest to the head, is nearly heart-shaped (sub-cordate) and hairless (glabrous). The Prothorax is broad as long, curved like a bow (arcuate) on the side (laterally) from apex to base, but broader in the front (anterior) than in the back part (posterior) where it does not have any curvilinear indentations (not sinuate), but the basal angle is sharp and projects, the outer margin is bent backward (reflexed). On the Prothorax the side groove (lateral sulcus) is narrow and reaches from the front (anterior) angle to the basal pore and is not continued along the basal margin to the basal longitudinal groove (sulcus), the space along the base between the grooves (sulci) and the median longitudinal line is not punctured (impunctate), the front part of the disk which is broadest across the median part is slightly convex and the sides of the rear (posterior) are not depressed or bent backwards (reflexed) on the site (laterally).

=== Wings ===
Intervals of the wings (elytra) are moderately raised on the central upper surface (disk). The wings are also hairless. The wings are rectangular (oblong), narrower than the base of the prothorax but with the shoulder part (humeral) slanting, the longitudinal depressed line (striae) is deep and not punctured (impunctate) and the intervals plane, the puncture on the third interval is about the middle (median).

== Distribution and habitat ==
A sole individual was collected from Mashunald province, Salisbury (now Harare) in Zimbabwe. No other locations are known.

Based on the sole collection record, A. emeritus is predominately found in subtropical highlands with a dry winter (Cwb).

Harare (Zimbabwe)
