= Platychelus pyropygus =

Scientific classification
- Kingdom: Animalia
- Phylum: Arthropoda
- Class: Insecta
- Order: Coleoptera
- Suborder: Polyphaga
- Infraorder: Scarabaeiformia
- Family: Scarabaeidae
- Genus: Platychelus
- Species: P. pyropygus

Binomial name
- Platychelus pyropygus Burmeister, 1844

Species of beetle

Platychelus pyropygus is a species of beetle of the family Scarabaeidae. It is found in South Africa (Western Cape).

== Description ==
Adults reach a length of about 6–6.25 mm (0.236–0.246 in). They are similar to Platychelus lupinus, but smaller and the pubescence on the pronotum, under side, and legs is greyish white. The propygidium and pygidium are clothed with very dense orange-yellow appressed hairs. The pronotum is also more shining bronze, but occasionally the hairs on the pronotum and under side are as fulvous as in P. lupinus, in which case the only distinctive character is the background of the scutellum entirely hidden by the thickly appressed orange hairs.
