= Platychelus brevis =

Scientific classification
- Kingdom: Animalia
- Phylum: Arthropoda
- Class: Insecta
- Order: Coleoptera
- Suborder: Polyphaga
- Infraorder: Scarabaeiformia
- Family: Scarabaeidae
- Genus: Platychelus
- Species: P. brevis

Binomial name
- Platychelus brevis Burmeister, 1844

Species of beetle

Platychelus brevis is a species of beetle of the family Scarabaeidae. It is found in South Africa (Cape).

== Description ==
Adults reach a length of about 5 mm (0.20 in). Males are very similar to Platychelus dimidiatus, but a little smaller, the pubescence on the pronotum is somewhat denser and more flavescent. Also, the elytra of the male are fuscous in the posterior part only, not on the sides, and the pygidium is much more densely covered with flavescent hairs. Females cannot be distinguished from that of Platychelus dimidiatus.
