= Harpalus lugubris =

Scientific classification
- Kingdom: Animalia
- Phylum: Arthropoda
- Class: Insecta
- Order: Coleoptera
- Suborder: Adephaga
- Family: Carabidae
- Genus: Harpalus
- Species: H. lugubris

Binomial name
- Harpalus lugubris Boheman, 1848

Species of beetle

Harpalus lugubris is a species of ground beetle in the subfamily Harpalinae. It was described by Boheman in 1848.
