= Platychelus semihirtus =

Scientific classification
- Kingdom: Animalia
- Phylum: Arthropoda
- Class: Insecta
- Order: Coleoptera
- Suborder: Polyphaga
- Infraorder: Scarabaeiformia
- Family: Scarabaeidae
- Genus: Platychelus
- Species: P. semihirtus

Binomial name
- Platychelus semihirtus Burmeister, 1844

Species of beetle

Platychelus semihirtus is a species of beetle of the family Scarabaeidae. It is found in South Africa (Western Cape).

== Description ==
Adults reach a length of about 2.8 mm (0.11 in). They are similar to Platychelus melanurus, but a little wider. They are black, covered with grey hairs on the front (anterior) part only, the back (posterior) is smooth and hairless (glabrous). The plate between the wings (scutellum) has short hairs. The hardened wing covers(elytra) are light reddish brown (testaceous) in colour, finely pitted and with hairs that lie against the surface. In males, the pygidium is covered with scale-like (squamose) yellow hairs.
