= Platychelus glabripennis =

Scientific classification
- Kingdom: Animalia
- Phylum: Arthropoda
- Class: Insecta
- Order: Coleoptera
- Suborder: Polyphaga
- Infraorder: Scarabaeiformia
- Family: Scarabaeidae
- Genus: Platychelus
- Species: P. glabripennis

Binomial name
- Platychelus glabripennis Burmeister, 1844

Species of beetle

Platychelus glabripennis is a species of beetle of the family Scarabaeidae. It is found in South Africa (Cape).

== Description ==
Adults reach a length of about 9 mm (0.35 in). The shape and size are similar to those of Platychelus hoploides. They are black, with a slight metallic tinge. The head is scabrose, but the clypeus is a little attenuate laterally towards the apex which is straight with the margin reflexed and the outer angles sharp. The pronotum, pygidial part, abdomen, pectus, and legs are clothed with a very long and very dense yellow pubescence. The elytra are brick red, somewhat shining, not distinctly costulate, but having instead of scabrose, closely set punctures, irregularly scattered round ones, more distinct and somewhat seriate in the dorsal intervals, and along the outer margin.
