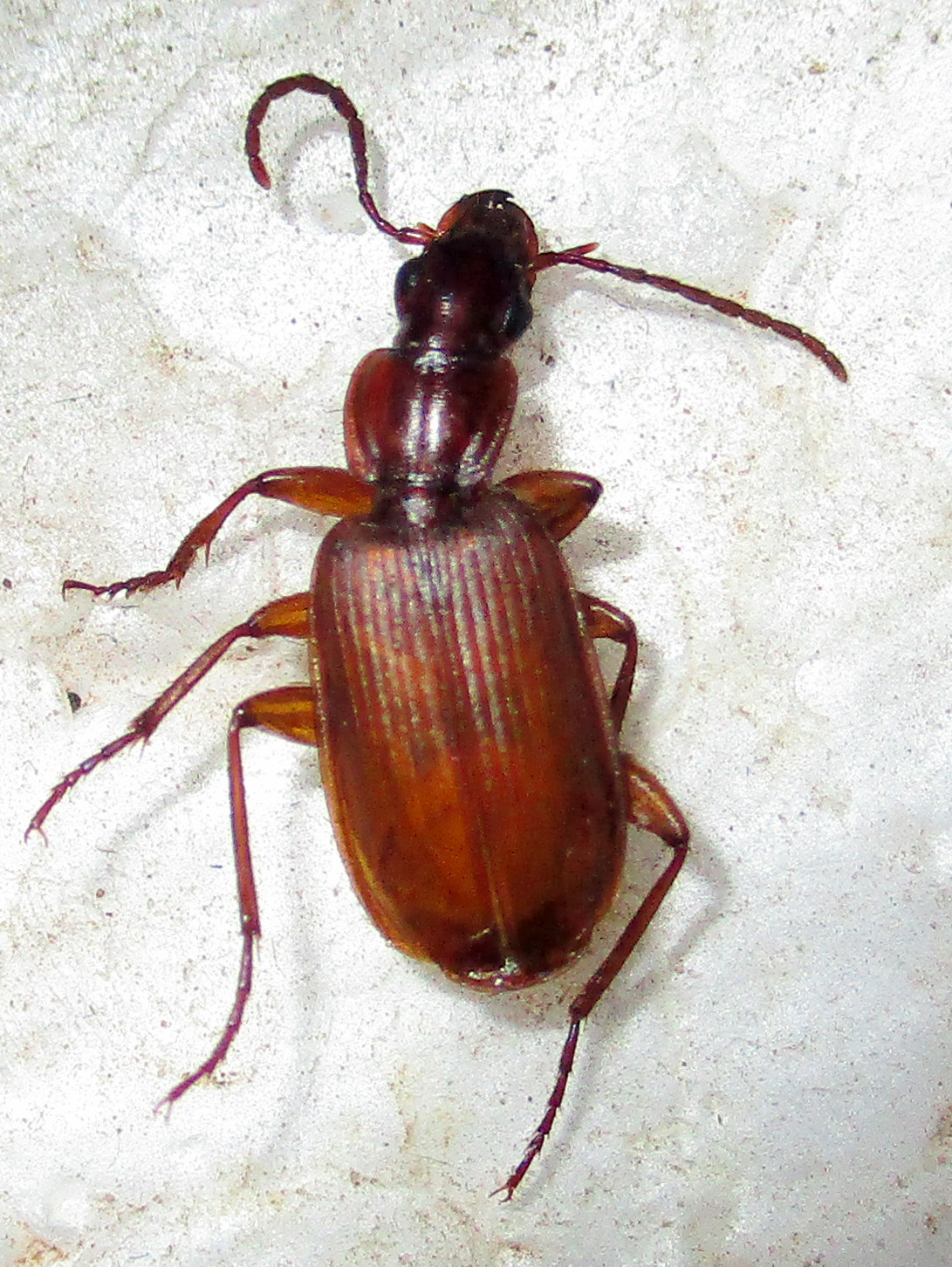
- Plagiopyga, Botswana

Scientific classification
- Kingdom: Animalia
- Phylum: Arthropoda
- Class: Insecta
- Order: Coleoptera
- Suborder: Adephaga
- Family: Carabidae
- Subfamily: Lebiinae
- Tribe: Lebiini
- Subtribe: Cymindidina
- Genus: Plagiopyga; Boheman, 1848

Synonyms
- Diaphoroncus Chaudoir, 1850; Plagyopyga Lacordaire, 1854

= Plagiopyga =

Genus of beetles

Plagiopyga is a genus in the ground beetle family Carabidae. There are about 13 described species in Plagiopyga, found in Africa.

== Species ==
These 13 species belong to the genus Plagiopyga:

- Plagiopyga camerunica Basilewsky, 1984 (Cameroon)
- Plagiopyga chaudoiri Basilewsky, 1943 (Rwanda, South Africa)
- Plagiopyga cyclogona (Chaudoir, 1850) (DR Congo, Tanzania, Zambia, Zimbabwe, Namibia, South Africa)
- Plagiopyga cymindoides Péringuey, 1896 (South Africa)
- Plagiopyga dolichocephala Basilewsky, 1954 (DR Congo)
- Plagiopyga endroedyi Basilewsky, 1984 (Zimbabwe, South Africa)
- Plagiopyga ferruginea Boheman, 1848 (Zimbabwe, South Africa)
- Plagiopyga leleupi Basilewsky, 1950 (DR Congo)
- Plagiopyga lissodera Basilewsky, 1954 (DR Congo)
- Plagiopyga namaqua Basilewsky, 1984 (South Africa)
- Plagiopyga rufa (Gory, 1833) (Namibia, South Africa)
- Plagiopyga taterae Basilewsky, 1950 (DR Congo)
- Plagiopyga transvaalensis Barker, 1919 (South Africa)
