= Microplidus vulgus =

Scientific classification
- Kingdom: Animalia
- Phylum: Arthropoda
- Class: Insecta
- Order: Coleoptera
- Suborder: Polyphaga
- Infraorder: Scarabaeiformia
- Family: Scarabaeidae
- Genus: Microplidus
- Species: M. vulgus

Binomial name
- Microplidus vulgus Péringuey, 1902

Species of beetle

Microplidus vulgus is a species of beetle of the family Scarabaeidae. It is found in South Africa (Eastern Cape).

== Description ==
Adults reach a length of about 6.5–7 mm (0.26–0.28 in). They are rusty brown with the legs a little paler, clothed above and underneath with a fine appressed greyish pubescence not dense enough to hide the colour of the background, and nowhere squamulose. They are similar in shape to Microplidus algoensis, the pronotum being also rounded and more ampliate laterally at the middle, but the apical margin of the clypeus is more reflexed. The elytra are very faintly bi- or tri-costulate, and have no series of short setae.
