= Platychelus nitidulus =

Scientific classification
- Kingdom: Animalia
- Phylum: Arthropoda
- Class: Insecta
- Order: Coleoptera
- Suborder: Polyphaga
- Infraorder: Scarabaeiformia
- Family: Scarabaeidae
- Genus: Platychelus
- Species: P. nitidulus

Binomial name
- Platychelus nitidulus Burmeister, 1844

Species of beetle

Platychelus nitidulus is a species of beetle of the family Scarabaeidae. It is found in South Africa (Western Cape).

== Description ==
Adults reach a length of about 4–4.25 mm (0.157–0.167 in). They are similar to Platychelus semivirgatus, but much smaller. The colour and sculpture are alike, and the pronotum especially is very metallic. In males, the clypeus is sharp laterally and has a very slight prominence in the centre. The elytra have the same vestiture, the pygidial part is equally hairy, and the only difference between the two species is to be found in the shape of the two basal teeth of the anterior tibiae which in P. nitidulus are separate, whereas in P. semivirgatus these are set very close to each other.
