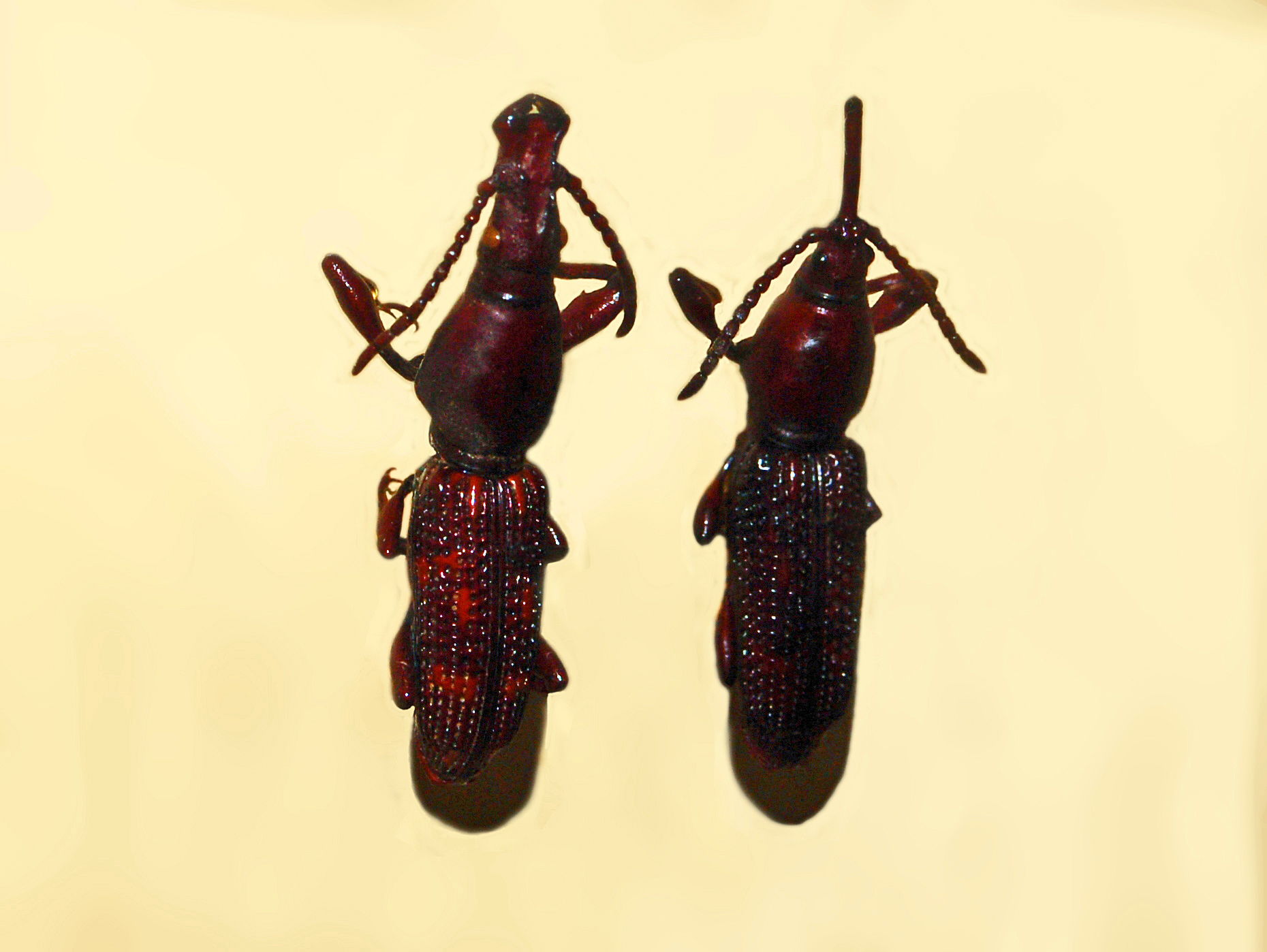
- From Myanmar. Male and female.

Scientific classification
- Domain: Eukaryota
- Kingdom: Animalia
- Phylum: Arthropoda
- Class: Insecta
- Order: Coleoptera
- Suborder: Polyphaga
- Infraorder: Cucujiformia
- Family: Brentidae
- Genus: Baryrhynchus
- Species: B. miles

Binomial name
- Baryrhynchus miles Boheman, 1845

= Baryrhynchus miles =

Species of beetle

Baryrhynchus miles is a species of beetle in the family Brentidae.

== Description ==
Baryrhynchus miles reaches about 10–28 millimetres (0.39–1.10 in) in length. The body colour is dark reddish-brown and the elytra are dotted, wrinkled and adorned by small reddish areas.

== Distribution ==
This species occurs in Myanmar, northern Vietnam, the Himalayas, and western Bengal.
