= Apagomerella versicolor =

Scientific classification
- Domain: Eukaryota
- Kingdom: Animalia
- Phylum: Arthropoda
- Class: Insecta
- Order: Coleoptera
- Suborder: Polyphaga
- Infraorder: Cucujiformia
- Family: Cerambycidae
- Tribe: Hemilophini
- Genus: Apagomerella
- Species: A. versicolor

Binomial name
- Apagomerella versicolor (Boheman, 1859)

Synonyms
- Apagomera suturella Bates, 1881; Apagomerella suturella Gilmour, 1962; Emphytoecia versicolor Gemminger & Harold, 1873; Phytoecia sanguinicollis Burmeister, 1865; Saperda versicolor Boheman, 1859

Species of beetle

Apagomerella versicolor is a species of beetle in the family Cerambycidae. It was described by Carl Henrik Boheman in 1859. It is known from Argentina, Uruguay, Paraguay and Brazil.
