= Platychelus conformis =

Scientific classification
- Kingdom: Animalia
- Phylum: Arthropoda
- Class: Insecta
- Order: Coleoptera
- Suborder: Polyphaga
- Infraorder: Scarabaeiformia
- Family: Scarabaeidae
- Genus: Platychelus
- Species: P. conformis

Binomial name
- Platychelus conformis Péringuey, 1902

Species of beetle

Platychelus conformis is a species of beetle of the family Scarabaeidae. It is found in South Africa (Cape).

== Description ==
Adults reach a length of about 4–4.25 mm (0.157–0.167 in). They are similar to Platychelus hottentotus, but much smaller and the elytra are darker brown. The head and pronotum are similar, the latter being more distinctly dark green, but the pubescence which covers it is much shorter. The scutellum is also hairy, but the hairs are greyish, and the elytra have no longitudinal impression along the suture or the humeral callus, and are covered equally with greyish appressed hairs, not as dense as on the pygidial area, abdomen, or pectus, where they are flavescent.
