= Pleophylla pseudopilosa =

Scientific classification
- Kingdom: Animalia
- Phylum: Arthropoda
- Class: Insecta
- Order: Coleoptera
- Suborder: Polyphaga
- Infraorder: Scarabaeiformia
- Family: Scarabaeidae
- Genus: Pleophylla
- Species: P. pseudopilosa

Binomial name
- Pleophylla pseudopilosa Ahrens, Beckett, Eberle & Fabrizi, 2017

Species of beetle

Pleophylla pseudopilosa is a species of beetle of the family Scarabaeidae. It is found in South Africa (Limpopo).

== Description ==
Adults reach a length of about 6.8–8.5 mm. The colour ranges from reddish brown with dark spots to entirely yellowish brown without spots. The pronotum is unicoloured and has dense and thick erect setae. The elytra have dark spots and dense, erect dorsal pilosity.

== Etymology ==
The species name is derived from Greek pseudo (meaning false) and the species name pilosa and refers to the similarity to Pleophylla pilosa.
