= Schizonycha citima =

Scientific classification
- Kingdom: Animalia
- Phylum: Arthropoda
- Clade: Pancrustacea
- Class: Insecta
- Order: Coleoptera
- Suborder: Polyphaga
- Infraorder: Scarabaeiformia
- Family: Scarabaeidae
- Genus: Schizonycha
- Species: S. citima

Binomial name
- Schizonycha citima Péringuey, 1904

Species of beetle

Schizonycha citima is a species of beetle of the family Scarabaeidae. It is found in Zimbabwe.

== Description ==
Adults reach a length of about 15–17 mm (0.59–0.67 in). They have a sub-cylindrical, pale testaceous body, with the head and pronotum light-chestnut. The club of the antennae is long and flavescent. The head and pronotum are similar in shape to those of Schizonycha valida and the sculpture is also of the same kind, but much less deep, and with the intervals less scabrose or not at all raised in the posterior part. The punctures on the elytra and on the pygidium are alike, but the elytra are not coriaceous.
