= Euides speciosa =

Scientific classification
- Domain: Eukaryota
- Kingdom: Animalia
- Phylum: Arthropoda
- Class: Insecta
- Order: Hemiptera
- Suborder: Auchenorrhyncha
- Infraorder: Fulgoromorpha
- Family: Delphacidae
- Genus: Euides
- Species: E. speciosa

Binomial name
- Euides speciosa (Boheman, 1845)

Species of true bug

Euides speciosa is a species of true bug belonging to the family Delphacidae.

It is native to Europe.
