= Cophes longiusculus =

Scientific classification
- Kingdom: Animalia
- Phylum: Arthropoda
- Class: Insecta
- Order: Coleoptera
- Suborder: Polyphaga
- Infraorder: Cucujiformia
- Family: Curculionidae
- Genus: Cophes
- Species: C. longiusculus

Binomial name
- Cophes longiusculus (Boheman, 1837)

Species of beetle

Cophes longiusculus is a species of hidden snout weevil in the beetle family Curculionidae. It is found in North America.
