= Platychelus pusillus =

Scientific classification
- Kingdom: Animalia
- Phylum: Arthropoda
- Clade: Pancrustacea
- Class: Insecta
- Order: Coleoptera
- Suborder: Polyphaga
- Infraorder: Scarabaeiformia
- Family: Scarabaeidae
- Genus: Platychelus
- Species: P. pusillus

Binomial name
- Platychelus pusillus Burmeister, 1844

Species of beetle

Platychelus pusillus is a species of beetle of the family Scarabaeidae. It is found in South Africa (Cape).

== Description ==
Adults reach a length of about 2.6 mm (0.10 in). They are similar to Platychelus melanurus, but the pits on their surface are more closely set and smaller, and the hairs are more grey. The wing covers (elytra) and legs are quite brown, the first are clothed with hairs that lie flat against the surface and the pits are more closely spaced. The hind part of the body is covered with small, nearly contiguous yellowish grey scales and the underside of the chest (pectus) with white hairs.
