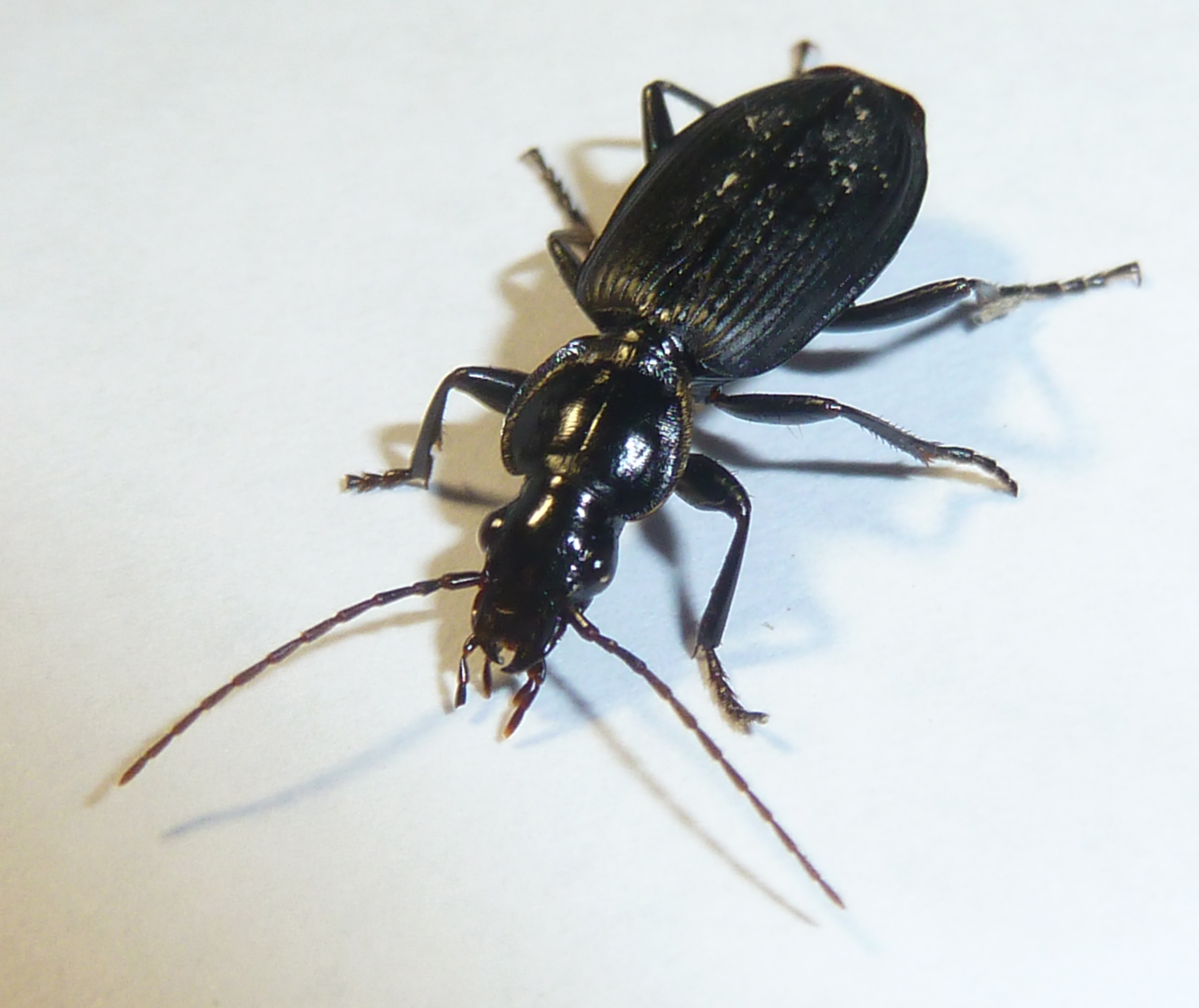

Scientific classification
- Kingdom: Animalia
- Phylum: Arthropoda
- Class: Insecta
- Order: Coleoptera
- Suborder: Adephaga
- Family: Carabidae
- Tribe: Lebiini
- Subtribe: Cymindidina
- Genus: Hystrichopus; Boheman, 1848

Subgenera
- Assadecma Basilewsky; Pseudomasoreus Desbrochers des Loges; Hystrichopus (s.s.) Boheman; Plagiopyga Boheman

Synonyms
- Assoterus Peringuey, 1896; Astus Peringuey, 1896; Ctenoncus Chaudoir, 1850

= Hystrichopus =

Genus of beetles

Hystrichopus is a genus of inconspicuous, nocturnal beetles in the family Carabidae. The genus is native to the greater part of the Afrotropics and locally to the southern Palaearctic.

== Species ==
The species include:

- Hystrichopus aethiopicus Alluaud, 1922
- Hystrichopus agilis Peringuey, 1892
- Hystrichopus alticola Alluaud, 1908
- Hystrichopus altitudinis Peringuey, 1899
- Hystrichopus angolensis Basilewsky, 1942
- Hystrichopus angusticollis Boheman, 1848
- Hystrichopus arnoldi Basilewsky, 1954
- Hystrichopus atratus (Chaudoir, 1850)
- Hystrichopus badius (Wiedemann, 1821)
- Hystrichopus bambutensis Basilewsky, 1984
- Hystrichopus brincki Basilewsky, 1958
- Hystrichopus brittoni Basilewsky, 1954
- Hystrichopus brunneus Basilewsky, 1954
- Hystrichopus colasi Basilewsky, 1954
- Hystrichopus cordicollis Basilewsky, 1954
- Hystrichopus cribripennis Basilewsky, 1954
- Hystrichopus culminicola Basilewsky, 1954
- Hystrichopus drago Basilewsky, 1984
- Hystrichopus elegans Raffray, 1885
- Hystrichopus femoralis Boheman, 1848
- Hystrichopus freyi Basilewsky, 1954
- Hystrichopus gracilis Peringuey, 1896
- Hystrichopus hanangiensis Basilewsky, 1962
- Hystrichopus hecqi Basilewsky, 1954
- Hystrichopus hessei Basilewsky, 1954
- Hystrichopus jacoti Basilewsky, 1954
- Hystrichopus jocquei Basilewsky, 1984
- Hystrichopus kaboboanus Basilewsky, 1960
- Hystrichopus kahuzicus Basilewsky, 1954
- Hystrichopus kalaharicus Basilewsky, 1984
- Hystrichopus kilimanus Basilewsky, 1962
- Hystrichopus kochi Basilewsky, 1984
- Hystrichopus laticollis Basilewsky, 1954
- Hystrichopus laurenti Basilewsky, 1954
- Hystrichopus leleupi Basilewsky, 1954
- Hystrichopus leleupianus Basilewsky, 1961
- Hystrichopus lubukae Basilewsky, 1954
- Hystrichopus marakwetianus Basilewsky, 1948
- Hystrichopus marlieri Basilewsky, 1954
- Hystrichopus massaicus Basilewsky, 1948
- Hystrichopus mateui Basilewsky, 1984
- Hystrichopus meruensis Alluaud, 1908
- Hystrichopus mirei Basilewsky, 1984
- Hystrichopus mniszechi Peringuey, 1896
- Hystrichopus natalensis Basilewsky, 1984
- Hystrichopus nigerrimus Basilewsky, 1961
- Hystrichopus nimbanus Basilewsky, 1951
- Hystrichopus nyassicus Basilewsky, 1984
- Hystrichopus olbrechtsi Basilewsky, 1954
- Hystrichopus platyderus Basilewsky, 1954
- Hystrichopus plesius Basilewsky, 1948
- Hystrichopus praedator Peringuey, 1896
- Hystrichopus pusillus Basilewsky, 1954
- Hystrichopus recticollis Peringuey, 1896
- Hystrichopus ruandanus Basilewsky, 1954
- Hystrichopus rufipennis (Dejean, 1831)
- Hystrichopus rufipes (Dejean, 1828)
- Hystrichopus rufofemoralis Basilewsky, 1984
- Hystrichopus rugicollis Basilewsky, 1961
- Hystrichopus seynaevei Basilewsky, 1954
- Hystrichopus similis Peringuey, 1896
- Hystrichopus subtenuicollis Basilewsky, 1984
- Hystrichopus sulcatus (Dejean, 1828)
- Hystrichopus tenuicollis Peringuey, 1896
- Hystrichopus uluguruanus Basilewsky, 1962
- Hystrichopus upembanus Basilewsky, 1984
- Hystrichopus uyttenboogaarti Basilewsky, 1948
- Hystrichopus velox Peringuey, 1904
- Hystrichopus vigilans (Sturm, 1824)
