= Aphodoharmogaster costipennis =

Scientific classification
- Kingdom: Animalia
- Phylum: Arthropoda
- Clade: Pancrustacea
- Class: Insecta
- Order: Coleoptera
- Suborder: Polyphaga
- Infraorder: Scarabaeiformia
- Family: Scarabaeidae
- Genus: Aphodoharmogaster
- Species: A. costipennis

Binomial name
- Aphodoharmogaster costipennis (Boheman, 1857)

Synonyms
- Aphodius costipennis Boheman, 1857; Aphodoharmogaster costata Endrödi, 1983; Aphodius costatus Dejean, 1833

Species of beetle

Aphodoharmogaster costipennis is a species of beetle of the family Scarabaeidae. It is found in South Africa (Free State, KwaZulu-Natal, Gauteng, Cape).

== Description ==
Adults reach a length of about 5–6.5 mm (0.20–0.26 in). They have an elongate-oval, convex, rather shiny, nearly glabrous body, with only the elytral interstices pubescent toward the apex. They are brown-blackish, with the margin of the clypeus, sides of the pronotum and sometimes the elytra reddish.
