= Microplidus luctuosus =

Scientific classification
- Kingdom: Animalia
- Phylum: Arthropoda
- Class: Insecta
- Order: Coleoptera
- Suborder: Polyphaga
- Infraorder: Scarabaeiformia
- Family: Scarabaeidae
- Genus: Microplidus
- Species: M. luctuosus

Binomial name
- Microplidus luctuosus (Boheman, 1857)

Synonyms
- Microplus luctuosus Boheman, 1857

Species of beetle

Microplidus luctuosus is a species of beetle of the family Scarabaeidae. It is found in South Africa (KwaZulu-Natal).

== Description ==
Adults reach a length of about 7–9 mm (0.28–0.35 in). They are black, opaque, and clothed with a fuscous tomentose pubescence on the upper side. The pronotum has three bands, often partly obliterated, of round scales and the elytra have four longitudinal bands of white round scales, broadly interrupted in the median part of the disk. The pygidial part and abdomen are clothed with elongate white scales and the legs are black and pubescent but not scaly.
