= Camentoserica livida =

Scientific classification
- Kingdom: Animalia
- Phylum: Arthropoda
- Clade: Pancrustacea
- Class: Insecta
- Order: Coleoptera
- Suborder: Polyphaga
- Infraorder: Scarabaeiformia
- Family: Scarabaeidae
- Genus: Camentoserica
- Species: C. livida

Binomial name
- Camentoserica livida (Boheman, 1860)

Synonyms
- Serica livida Boheman, 1860

Species of beetle

Camentoserica livida is a species of beetle of the family Scarabaeidae. It is found in Namibia, South Africa (Mpumalanga, Free State, Limpopo) and Zimbabwe.

== Description ==
Adults reach a length of about 7-7.5 mm. They are testaceous or testaceous-red and glabrous. The club of the antennae is flavescent.
