= Abacetus obtusus =

Scientific classification
- Kingdom: Animalia
- Phylum: Arthropoda
- Class: Insecta
- Order: Coleoptera
- Suborder: Adephaga
- Family: Carabidae
- Genus: Abacetus
- Species: A. obtusus

Binomial name
- Abacetus obtusus (Boheman, 1848)

Species of beetle

Abacetus obtusus is a species of ground beetle in the subfamily Pterostichinae. It was described by Boheman in 1848.
