= Platychelus nitens =

Scientific classification
- Kingdom: Animalia
- Phylum: Arthropoda
- Class: Insecta
- Order: Coleoptera
- Suborder: Polyphaga
- Infraorder: Scarabaeiformia
- Family: Scarabaeidae
- Genus: Platychelus
- Species: P. nitens

Binomial name
- Platychelus nitens (Blanchard, 1850)

Synonyms
- Dichelus nitens Blanchard, 1850

Species of beetle

Platychelus nitens is a species of beetle of the family Scarabaeidae. It is found in South Africa (Cape).

== Description ==
Adults reach a length of about 5–6 mm (0.20–0.24 in). They are similar to Platychelus hoploides, but smaller and more depressed. They are black and shining. The pronotum is convex, shining and hairy, with the hairs black. The elytra are depressed, broad, uni-costate, granulated and black, with the outer part rufous except for the humeral margin. The legs are black. The abdomen is entirely black, and has ashy-grey hairs inwardly.
