= Platychelus puerilis =

Scientific classification
- Kingdom: Animalia
- Phylum: Arthropoda
- Class: Insecta
- Order: Coleoptera
- Suborder: Polyphaga
- Infraorder: Scarabaeiformia
- Family: Scarabaeidae
- Genus: Platychelus
- Species: P. puerilis

Binomial name
- Platychelus puerilis Burmeister, 1844

Species of beetle

Platychelus puerilis is a species of beetle of the family Scarabaeidae. It is found in South Africa (Cape).

== Description ==
Adults reach a length of about 3 mm (0.12 in). They are very similar to Platychelus musculus, but it is a little more slender. The clypeus is rounded and moderately broad, and the head and pronotum are scabroso-punctate, the latter, which is nearly purple, is quite impunctate behind, and has a coating of long greyish hairs. The elytra are strongly punctate, deeply impressed alongside the humeral callus and clothed with compressed white hairs, similar but longer hairs are found on the pygidial part, abdomen and pectus. The legs are also similarly hairy, but they are black.
