= Schizonycha languens =

Scientific classification
- Kingdom: Animalia
- Phylum: Arthropoda
- Clade: Pancrustacea
- Class: Insecta
- Order: Coleoptera
- Suborder: Polyphaga
- Infraorder: Scarabaeiformia
- Family: Scarabaeidae
- Genus: Schizonycha
- Species: S. languens

Binomial name
- Schizonycha languens Péringuey, 1904

Species of beetle

Schizonycha languens is a species of beetle of the family Scarabaeidae. It is found in South Africa (North West, Free State).

== Description ==
Adults reach a length of about 11–11.5 mm (0.43–0.45 in). They have the same shape, size, colouring, and sculpture of as Schizonycha affinis, but the punctures of the pronotum are slightly deeper. Furthermore, the difference in the shape of the genital armature of the males of the two species is very great.
