= Schizonycha puncticollis =

Scientific classification
- Kingdom: Animalia
- Phylum: Arthropoda
- Clade: Pancrustacea
- Class: Insecta
- Order: Coleoptera
- Suborder: Polyphaga
- Infraorder: Scarabaeiformia
- Family: Scarabaeidae
- Genus: Schizonycha
- Species: S. puncticollis

Binomial name
- Schizonycha puncticollis Boheman, 1857

Species of beetle

Schizonycha puncticollis is a species of beetle of the family Scarabaeidae. It is found in South Africa (Free State, Gauteng, Mpumalanga, Limpopo) and Namibia.

== Description ==
Adults reach a length of about 11.5–15 mm (0.45–0.59 in). The colour varies from reddish-testaceous to dark red-brown.
