= Schizonycha carbonaria =

Scientific classification
- Kingdom: Animalia
- Phylum: Arthropoda
- Clade: Pancrustacea
- Class: Insecta
- Order: Coleoptera
- Suborder: Polyphaga
- Infraorder: Scarabaeiformia
- Family: Scarabaeidae
- Genus: Schizonycha
- Species: S. carbonaria

Binomial name
- Schizonycha carbonaria Boheman, 1857

Species of beetle

Schizonycha carbonaria is a species of beetle of the family Scarabaeidae. It is found in South Africa (KwaZulu-Natal) and Mozambique.

== Description ==
Adults reach a length of about 9–10.5 mm (0.35–0.41 in). They are black, with the palpi, antennae and legs piceous, and each puncture on the upper surface with a short, but distinct white hair.
