= Microplidus persimilis =

Scientific classification
- Kingdom: Animalia
- Phylum: Arthropoda
- Class: Insecta
- Order: Coleoptera
- Suborder: Polyphaga
- Infraorder: Scarabaeiformia
- Family: Scarabaeidae
- Genus: Microplidus
- Species: M. persimilis

Binomial name
- Microplidus persimilis Péringuey, 1902

Species of beetle

Microplidus persimilis is a species of beetle of the family Scarabaeidae. It is found in South Africa (KwaZulu-Natal).

== Description ==
Adults reach a length of about 6 mm (0.24 in). They are chestnut-brown with the legs rufescent, and covered above and under with flavescent scales. They are similar to Microplidus pumilus, but they are more elongate, the scales, which are smaller, are more closely set, thus almost obscuring the colour of the background, and those on the underside and pygidial part are round and also very closely set. Each elytron has four plain rows of whitish setae in addition to a sutural and an outer marginal one.
