= Trigonorhinus =

Scientific classification
- Domain: Eukaryota
- Kingdom: Animalia
- Phylum: Arthropoda
- Class: Insecta
- Order: Coleoptera
- Suborder: Polyphaga
- Infraorder: Cucujiformia
- Family: Anthribidae
- Subfamily: Anthribinae
- Genus: Trigonorhinus; Wollaston, 1861

Genus of beetles

Trigonorhinus is a genus of fungus weevils in the beetle family Anthribidae. There are about 16 described species in Trigonorhinus.

== Species ==
These 16 species belong to the genus Trigonorhinus:

- Trigonorhinus alternatus (Say, 1827)
- Trigonorhinus annulatus (Carr, 1930)
- Trigonorhinus areolatus (Boheman, 1845)
- Trigonorhinus championi (Jordan, 1906)
- Trigonorhinus griseus (LeConte, 1876)
- Trigonorhinus lepidus Valentine, 1998
- Trigonorhinus limbatus (Say, 1827)
- Trigonorhinus nigromaculatus (Schaeffer, 1906)
- Trigonorhinus ornatus (Schaeffer, 1906)
- Trigonorhinus riddelliae
- Trigonorhinus rotundatus (LeConte, 1876)
- Trigonorhinus sordidus (Scudder, 1893)
- Trigonorhinus sticticus (Boheman, 1833)
- Trigonorhinus strigosus (Jordan, 1907)
- Trigonorhinus tomentosus (Say, 1827)
- Trigonorhinus zeae (Wolfrum, 1931)
