= Platychelus litigosus =

Scientific classification
- Kingdom: Animalia
- Phylum: Arthropoda
- Class: Insecta
- Order: Coleoptera
- Suborder: Polyphaga
- Infraorder: Scarabaeiformia
- Family: Scarabaeidae
- Genus: Platychelus
- Species: P. litigosus

Binomial name
- Platychelus litigosus Burmeister, 1844

Synonyms
- Platychelus cinereus Blanchard, 1850

Species of beetle

Platychelus litigosus is a species of beetle of the family Scarabaeidae. It is found in South Africa (Eastern Cape).

== Description ==
Adults reach a length of about 6.5–7 mm (0.26–0.28 in). They are very similar to Platychelus discolor, with the only difference to be found in the shape of the clypeus which in the male is straight at apex with the angles sharp and plainly reflexed, while in the female these angles are more rounded than in P. discolor.
