= Platychelus excentrus =

Scientific classification
- Kingdom: Animalia
- Phylum: Arthropoda
- Class: Insecta
- Order: Coleoptera
- Suborder: Polyphaga
- Infraorder: Scarabaeiformia
- Family: Scarabaeidae
- Genus: Platychelus
- Species: P. excentrus

Binomial name
- Platychelus excentrus Péringuey, 1902

Species of beetle

Platychelus excentrus is a species of beetle of the family Scarabaeidae. It is found in South Africa (Cape).

== Description ==
Adults reach a length of about 7.5–9 mm (0.30–0.35 in). They are black, with wing covers (elytra) that are reddish brown. The surface of the head is rough with very closely spaced pits (scabroso-punctate) and the club shaped tip of the antennae is reddish brown. The plate behind the head (pronotum) is covered with very dense and very long shaggy hairs, black in the front, greyish white in the back. The elytra are covered with black hairs that lie fairly flat against the surface, but along the base there is a fringe of long, white hairs, a patch of these is also located in the discoidal impression in the centre, and a longer patch is along the suture, at about the middle of the elytra. The rear tip (pygidial part), abdomen, and underside of the chest (pectus) are clothed with greyish white, dense, shaggy (villose) hairs, and the legs are covered with black ones.
