= Platychelus dispar =

Scientific classification
- Kingdom: Animalia
- Phylum: Arthropoda
- Class: Insecta
- Order: Coleoptera
- Suborder: Polyphaga
- Infraorder: Scarabaeiformia
- Family: Scarabaeidae
- Genus: Platychelus
- Species: P. dispar

Binomial name
- Platychelus dispar Burmeister, 1844

Species of beetle

Platychelus dispar is a species of beetle of the family Scarabaeidae. It is found in South Africa (Cape).

== Description ==
Adults reach a length of about 6.5 mm (0.26 in). They are black, with the elytra brownish red. They are clothed on the pronotum, under side and legs with a very dense ashy-grey pubescence. The elytra have a short but deep, basal, supra-humeral impression, and are slightly impressed longitudinally along the median part of the suture, they are moderately closely punctured, each puncture bearing an appressed short blackish hair.
