= Trigonorhinus limbatus =

Scientific classification
- Kingdom: Animalia
- Phylum: Arthropoda
- Clade: Pancrustacea
- Class: Insecta
- Order: Coleoptera
- Suborder: Polyphaga
- Infraorder: Cucujiformia
- Superfamily: Curculionoidea
- Family: Anthribidae
- Genus: Trigonorhinus
- Species: T. limbatus

Binomial name
- Trigonorhinus limbatus (Say, 1827)

Species of beetle

Trigonorhinus limbatus is a species of fungus weevil in the beetle family Anthribidae. It is found in Central America and North America.

== Subspecies ==
These two subspecies belong to the species Trigonorhinus limbatus:

- Trigonorhinus limbatus limbatus
- Trigonorhinus limbatus vestitus
