= Microplidus fulvovittis =

Scientific classification
- Kingdom: Animalia
- Phylum: Arthropoda
- Class: Insecta
- Order: Coleoptera
- Suborder: Polyphaga
- Infraorder: Scarabaeiformia
- Family: Scarabaeidae
- Genus: Microplidus
- Species: M. fulvovittis

Binomial name
- Microplidus fulvovittis (Brancsik, 1897)

Synonyms
- Hoplia fulvovittis Brancsik, 1897

Species of beetle

Microplidus fulvovittis is a species of beetle of the family Scarabaeidae. It is found in southern Africa, where it was recorded from Boroma, on the Zambesi River.

== Description ==
Adults reach a length of about 5–6 mm (0.20–0.24 in). They have an elongate, convex, red, weakly ochraceous body on the upper side, which is densely clothed with sub-erect setulose hairs. The underside is densely white squamose. The head is elongated and clothed with ochraceous scales and the antennae are red. The pronotum is convex, broader than long, obtusely ampliate in the middle of the sides, much narrower in front than behind and with the posterior margin obtusely produced, ochraceous squamose with two dorsal distinct fulvescent bands, and two less distinct ones on the sides. The elytra are ochraceous and adorned with a short, oblique dorsal fulvescent band. The abdominal segments are glabrous on the upper side and the legs are red, and more opaquely squamose than the rest of the body.
