= Microplidus pumilus =

Scientific classification
- Kingdom: Animalia
- Phylum: Arthropoda
- Class: Insecta
- Order: Coleoptera
- Suborder: Polyphaga
- Infraorder: Scarabaeiformia
- Family: Scarabaeidae
- Genus: Microplidus
- Species: M. pumilus

Binomial name
- Microplidus pumilus (Boheman, 1857)

Synonyms
- Microplus pumilus Boheman, 1857

Species of beetle

Microplidus pumilus is a species of beetle of the family Scarabaeidae. It is found in South Africa (KwaZulu-Natal).

== Description ==
Adults reach a length of about 4 mm (0.16 in). They are chestnut-brown, covered on the upper and the undersides with scales, which are closely set but not quite contiguous, small, elongate and slightly flavescent. The head and pronotum are very closely punctured and not pubescent, while the whole head is covered with scales. The scales on the pronotum are quite similar to those on the elytra, the latter are not plainly costulate, but along the suture and also on each side there are faint rows of minute whitish setae. The scales on the pygidial part and the underside are finer, more appressed, and more hair-like than on the upper side.
