= Pleophylla pilosa =

Scientific classification
- Kingdom: Animalia
- Phylum: Arthropoda
- Class: Insecta
- Order: Coleoptera
- Suborder: Polyphaga
- Infraorder: Scarabaeiformia
- Family: Scarabaeidae
- Genus: Pleophylla
- Species: P. pilosa

Binomial name
- Pleophylla pilosa Boheman, 1857

Synonyms
- Pleophylla opalina Schaufuss, 1871

Species of beetle

Pleophylla pilosa is a species of beetle of the family Scarabaeidae. It is found in South Africa.

== Description ==
Adults reach a length of about 9 mm. The pronotum is unicoloured and has dense and thick erect setae. The elytra have dark spots and dense, erect dorsal pilosity.
