= Platychelus cicatrix =

Scientific classification
- Kingdom: Animalia
- Phylum: Arthropoda
- Class: Insecta
- Order: Coleoptera
- Suborder: Polyphaga
- Infraorder: Scarabaeiformia
- Family: Scarabaeidae
- Genus: Platychelus
- Species: P. cicatrix

Binomial name
- Platychelus cicatrix Burmeister, 1844

Species of beetle

Platychelus cicatrix is a species of beetle of the family Scarabaeidae. It is found in South Africa (Cape).

== Description ==
Adults reach a length of about 5 mm (0.20 in). The head, pronotum and legs of the males are bronze and shining, while the under side is black with a metallic tinge. The elytra are reddish brown. The head is granular and setulose and the pronotum is covered with deep, not very closely set punctures, densely villose, the villosity long and flavescent. The scutellum is covered with whitish, thick, squamose hairs and the elytra are closely punctured, clothed with very dense but very short, erect, slightly flavescent hairs, and have in the centre of the disk a small fascicle of white hairs, and another one, close to the suture and adjoining a transverse oblique impressed line. The pygidial part and abdomen are clothed with dense, contiguous white scales, and the pygidium also has a fringe of greyish cilias all round. The abdomen is entirely covered with thick, squamose hairs. Females are similar to males, but the scales on the pygidial part and abdomen are a little more flavescent.
