= Trigonorhinus griseus =

Scientific classification
- Kingdom: Animalia
- Phylum: Arthropoda
- Class: Insecta
- Order: Coleoptera
- Suborder: Polyphaga
- Infraorder: Cucujiformia
- Family: Anthribidae
- Genus: Trigonorhinus
- Species: T. griseus

Binomial name
- Trigonorhinus griseus (LeConte, 1876)

Species of beetle

Trigonorhinus griseus is a species of fungus weevil in the Anthribidae family of beetles. It is found in Central America and North America.
