= Microplidus =

Scientific classification
- Kingdom: Animalia
- Phylum: Arthropoda
- Class: Insecta
- Order: Coleoptera
- Suborder: Polyphaga
- Infraorder: Scarabaeiformia
- Family: Scarabaeidae
- Subfamily: Melolonthinae
- Tribe: Hopliini
- Genus: Microplidus; Péringuey, 1902

Genus of leaf beetles

Microplidus is a genus of beetles belonging to the family Scarabaeidae.

== Species ==
- Microplidus abdominalis Burgeon, 1945
- Microplidus albifrons Moser, 1918
- Microplidus albiger (Burmeister, 1855)
- Microplidus algoensis Péringuey, 1902
- Microplidus benitoensis Moser, 1918
- Microplidus binotatus Péringuey, 1902
- Microplidus cinereus Moser, 1918
- Microplidus cinerovittatus Schein, 1956
- Microplidus collarti Burgeon, 1945
- Microplidus decemlineatus Burgeon, 1945
- Microplidus flavidus Moser, 1918
- Microplidus fulvovittis (Brancsik, 1897)
- Microplidus griseovestitus Moser, 1918
- Microplidus luctuosus (Boheman, 1857)
- Microplidus modestus Schein, 1956
- Microplidus persimilis Péringuey, 1902
- Microplidus pumilus (Boheman, 1857)
- Microplidus rainoni Lacroix & Coache, 2017
- Microplidus ruandanus Schein, 1956
- Microplidus stabilis Péringuey, 1902
- Microplidus urundianus Schein, 1956
- Microplidus usambaranus Moser, 1918
- Microplidus vulgus Péringuey, 1902
