= Trigonorhinus tomentosus =

Scientific classification
- Domain: Eukaryota
- Kingdom: Animalia
- Phylum: Arthropoda
- Class: Insecta
- Order: Coleoptera
- Suborder: Polyphaga
- Infraorder: Cucujiformia
- Family: Anthribidae
- Genus: Trigonorhinus
- Species: T. tomentosus

Binomial name
- Trigonorhinus tomentosus (Say, 1827)

Species of beetle

Trigonorhinus tomentosus is a species of fungus weevil in the beetle family Anthribidae. It is found in Central America and North America.

== Subspecies ==
These two subspecies belong to the species Trigonorhinus tomentosus:

- Trigonorhinus tomentosus andersoni Valentine
- Trigonorhinus tomentosus tomentosus (Say, 1826)
