= Apagomerella =

Scientific classification
- Domain: Eukaryota
- Kingdom: Animalia
- Phylum: Arthropoda
- Class: Insecta
- Order: Coleoptera
- Suborder: Polyphaga
- Infraorder: Cucujiformia
- Family: Cerambycidae
- Tribe: Hemilophini
- Genus: Apagomerella

Genus of beetles

Apagomerella is a genus of longhorn beetles of the subfamily Lamiinae, containing the following species:

- Apagomerella dissimilis Galileo & Martins, 2005
- Apagomerella versicolor (Boheman, 1859)
