= Microplidus albiger =

Scientific classification
- Kingdom: Animalia
- Phylum: Arthropoda
- Class: Insecta
- Order: Coleoptera
- Suborder: Polyphaga
- Infraorder: Scarabaeiformia
- Family: Scarabaeidae
- Genus: Microplidus
- Species: M. albiger

Binomial name
- Microplidus albiger (Burmeister, 1855)

Synonyms
- Microplus albiger Burmeister, 1855

Species of beetle

Microplidus albiger is a species of beetle of the family Scarabaeidae. It is found in South Africa (KwaZulu-Natal).

== Description ==
Adults reach a length of about 8–8.5 mm (0.31–0.33 in). They are reddish brown, with the head and pronotum black, covered above and under with round white scales. The head is very briefly pubescent and the pronotum has a margin of very short setae. The scutellum and pygidium are densely scaly.
