= Aphodoharmogaster =

Scientific classification
- Kingdom: Animalia
- Phylum: Arthropoda
- Clade: Pancrustacea
- Class: Insecta
- Order: Coleoptera
- Suborder: Polyphaga
- Infraorder: Scarabaeiformia
- Family: Scarabaeidae
- Subfamily: Aphodiinae
- Tribe: Aphodiini
- Genus: Aphodoharmogaster; Endrödi, 1983

Genus of beetles

Aphodoharmogaster is a genus of beetles of the family Scarabaeidae.

== Species ==
- Aphodoharmogaster consocius (Endrödi, 1964)
- Aphodoharmogaster costipennis (Boheman, 1857)
