= Pleophylla navicularis =

Scientific classification
- Kingdom: Animalia
- Phylum: Arthropoda
- Class: Insecta
- Order: Coleoptera
- Suborder: Polyphaga
- Infraorder: Scarabaeiformia
- Family: Scarabaeidae
- Genus: Pleophylla
- Species: P. navicularis

Binomial name
- Pleophylla navicularis Burmeister, 1855

Species of beetle

Pleophylla navicularis is a species of beetle of the family Scarabaeidae. It is found in South Africa (Gauteng, North West, Mpumalanga, Limpopo, KwaZulu-Natal).

== Description ==
Adults reach a length of about 13 mm. The pronotum is unicoloured and has dense and thick erect setae. The elytra have dark spots and dense, erect dorsal pilosity.
