= Platychelus basalis =

Scientific classification
- Kingdom: Animalia
- Phylum: Arthropoda
- Class: Insecta
- Order: Coleoptera
- Suborder: Polyphaga
- Infraorder: Scarabaeiformia
- Family: Scarabaeidae
- Genus: Platychelus
- Species: P. basalis

Binomial name
- Platychelus basalis Péringuey, 1902

Species of beetle

Platychelus basalis is a species of beetle of the family Scarabaeidae. It is found in South Africa (Cape).

== Description ==
Adults reach a length of about 6 mm (0.24 in). They are very similar to Platychelus dimidiatus, but much less hairy. The vestiture of the pygidial part and of the abdomen is similar. The elytra are of the same shining bronze colour as the head and pronotum, but the whole basal part is testaceous with a metallic tinge, and there is no trace of the bands of greyish-white hairs.
