= Platychelus karrooensis =

Scientific classification
- Kingdom: Animalia
- Phylum: Arthropoda
- Clade: Pancrustacea
- Class: Insecta
- Order: Coleoptera
- Suborder: Polyphaga
- Infraorder: Scarabaeiformia
- Family: Scarabaeidae
- Genus: Platychelus
- Species: P. karrooensis

Binomial name
- Platychelus karrooensis Péringuey, 1902

Species of beetle

Platychelus karrooensis is a species of beetle of the family Scarabaeidae. It is found in South Africa (Western Cape).

== Description ==
Adults reach a length of about 5.5–6 mm (0.22–0.24 in). They are bronze, but somewhat greenish on the pronotum. The elytra are testaceous red, very shiny, but with scarcely a metallic sheen. The head is very granulose, and slightly pubescent, while the pronotum is very closely scabroso-punctate laterally and in the anterior part, but with somewhat closely set punctures in the median part, very slightly grooved longitudinally in the anterior part only, and clothed with a dense greyish and sub-flavescent, long pubescence. The scutellum is covered with thick flavous hairs and the elytra are very closely punctured, and covered with a very short, appressed, slightly fuscous pubescence. The pygidial part and abdomen are clothed with a very dense, thick yellowish pubescence.
