= Platychelus retensus =

Scientific classification
- Kingdom: Animalia
- Phylum: Arthropoda
- Class: Insecta
- Order: Coleoptera
- Suborder: Polyphaga
- Infraorder: Scarabaeiformia
- Family: Scarabaeidae
- Genus: Platychelus
- Species: P. retensus

Binomial name
- Platychelus retensus Péringuey, 1902

Species of beetle

Platychelus retensus is a species of beetle of the family Scarabaeidae. It is found in South Africa (Western Cape).

== Description ==
Adults reach a length of about 6.5 mm (0.26 in). They are dark bronze, a little more shiny on the pronotum than on the rest of the body. The head is covered with large, non-contiguous granules and the pronotum is clothed with a somewhat dense, sub-erect pubescence. It has small granules not closely set along the anterior margin and also on the anterior part of the sides, but the remainder of the surface is extremely finely aciculate, and in the median part of the disk only are there a few broad, scattered punctures, and there is a median longitudinal groove deeper and plainer in the posterior part. The scutellum is slightly pubescent and the elytra have some deep, somewhat irregularly scattered punctures bearing each an appressed, long, bristle-like white hair. The pygidial part and abdomen are not very densely pubescent.
