= Platychelus hottentotus =

Scientific classification
- Kingdom: Animalia
- Phylum: Arthropoda
- Class: Insecta
- Order: Coleoptera
- Suborder: Polyphaga
- Infraorder: Scarabaeiformia
- Family: Scarabaeidae
- Genus: Platychelus
- Species: P. hottentotus

Binomial name
- Platychelus hottentotus Péringuey, 1902

Species of beetle

Platychelus hottentotus is a species of beetle of the family Scarabaeidae. It is found in South Africa (Cape).

== Description ==
Adults reach a length of about 6–9 mm (0.24–0.35 in). They have the same shape and sculpture as Platychelus unguiculatus, but somewhat more robust. The pronotum is somewhat metallic green, but the elytra have not only along the suture a broad band of very dense and somewhat long, lanceolate appressed white hairs, but the long impression along the humeral callus is filled with a band of similar hairs. The scutellum is densely hairy, and the hairs are white. The appressed hairs on the pygidium are white in both sexes.
