= Microplidus stabilis =

Scientific classification
- Kingdom: Animalia
- Phylum: Arthropoda
- Class: Insecta
- Order: Coleoptera
- Suborder: Polyphaga
- Infraorder: Scarabaeiformia
- Family: Scarabaeidae
- Genus: Microplidus
- Species: M. stabilis

Binomial name
- Microplidus stabilis Péringuey, 1902

Species of beetle

Microplidus stabilis is a species of beetle of the family Scarabaeidae. It is found in South Africa (KwaZulu-Natal).

== Description ==
Adults reach a length of about 6.5–7.25 mm (0.256–0.285 in). They are similar in size, shape, and sculpture to Microplidus albidus. They are covered with scales identical in colour and size, but on each elytron there is a small, sub-quadrate or transverse denuded space close to the suture, and situated slightly past the median part.
