= Platychelus =

Scientific classification
- Kingdom: Animalia
- Phylum: Arthropoda
- Class: Insecta
- Order: Coleoptera
- Suborder: Polyphaga
- Infraorder: Scarabaeiformia
- Family: Scarabaeidae
- Subfamily: Melolonthinae
- Tribe: Hopliini
- Genus: Platychelus; Burmeister, 1844

Synonyms
- Encyophanes Burmeister, 1844

Genus beetles

Platychelus is a genus of beetles belonging to the family Scarabaeidae.

== Species ==
- Platychelus aequatorialis (Lansberge, 1886)
- Platychelus alternans Burmeister, 1844
- Platychelus anomalus Burmeister, 1844
- Platychelus basalis Péringuey, 1902
- Platychelus brevis Burmeister, 1844
- Platychelus caffer (Boheman, 1857)
- Platychelus cicatrix Burmeister, 1844
- Platychelus conformis Péringuey, 1902
- Platychelus dimidiatus Burmeister, 1844
- Platychelus discolor Burmeister, 1844
- Platychelus dispar Burmeister, 1844
- Platychelus excentrus Péringuey, 1902
- Platychelus expansus Péringuey, 1902
- Platychelus expositus (Harold, 1879)
- Platychelus fallax Schein, 1959
- Platychelus gentilis Péringuey, 1902
- Platychelus glabripennis Burmeister, 1844
- Platychelus gravidus (Burmeister, 1844)
- Platychelus hoploides Burmeister, 1844
- Platychelus hottentotus Péringuey, 1902
- Platychelus intermedius Blanchard, 1850
- Platychelus jucundus Péringuey, 1902
- Platychelus karrooensis Péringuey, 1902
- Platychelus lepidotus Burmeister, 1844
- Platychelus litigosus Burmeister, 1844
- Platychelus lupinus Burmeister, 1844
- Platychelus lutosus Schein, 1959
- Platychelus melanurus Burmeister, 1844
- Platychelus musculus Burmeister, 1844
- Platychelus nitens (Blanchard, 1850)
- Platychelus nitidulus Burmeister, 1844
- Platychelus puerilis Burmeister, 1844
- Platychelus pugionatus Péringuey, 1902
- Platychelus pusillus Burmeister, 1844
- Platychelus pyropygus Burmeister, 1844
- Platychelus retensus Péringuey, 1902
- Platychelus semihirtus Burmeister, 1844
- Platychelus semivirgatus Burmeister, 1844
- Platychelus squamosus Burmeister, 1844
- Platychelus transvaalensis Schein, 1959
- Platychelus trunculus (Burmeister, 1855)
- Platychelus unguiculatus Péringuey, 1902
- Platychelus virgatus Burmeister, 1844
