= Platychelus virgatus =

Scientific classification
- Kingdom: Animalia
- Phylum: Arthropoda
- Class: Insecta
- Order: Coleoptera
- Suborder: Polyphaga
- Infraorder: Scarabaeiformia
- Family: Scarabaeidae
- Genus: Platychelus
- Species: P. virgatus

Binomial name
- Platychelus virgatus Burmeister, 1844

Species of beetle

Platychelus virgatus is a species of beetle of the family Scarabaeidae. It is found in South Africa (Western Cape).

== Description ==
Adults reach a length of about 5.5 mm (0.22 in). They are black, with a very faint metallic tinge. The pronotum is clothed with a moderately short, dense greyish pubescence and the scutellum is hairy. The elytra have three moderately distinct bands of appressed greyish hairs, the median one of which is obliterated past the middle. The pygidial part, abdomen and legs are clothed with appressed hairs, which are flavescent on the pygidium and greyish elsewhere.
