= Schizonycha mimocontinens =

Scientific classification
- Kingdom: Animalia
- Phylum: Arthropoda
- Clade: Pancrustacea
- Class: Insecta
- Order: Coleoptera
- Suborder: Polyphaga
- Infraorder: Scarabaeiformia
- Family: Scarabaeidae
- Genus: Schizonycha
- Species: S. mimocontinens

Binomial name
- Schizonycha mimocontinens Pope, 1960

Species of beetle

Schizonycha mimocontinens is a species of beetle of the family Scarabaeidae. It is found in South Africa (Mpumalanga, KwaZulu-Natal) and Eswatini.

== Description ==
Adults reach a length of about 12–13.5 mm (0.47–0.53 in). They are nearly identical to Schizonycha continens.
