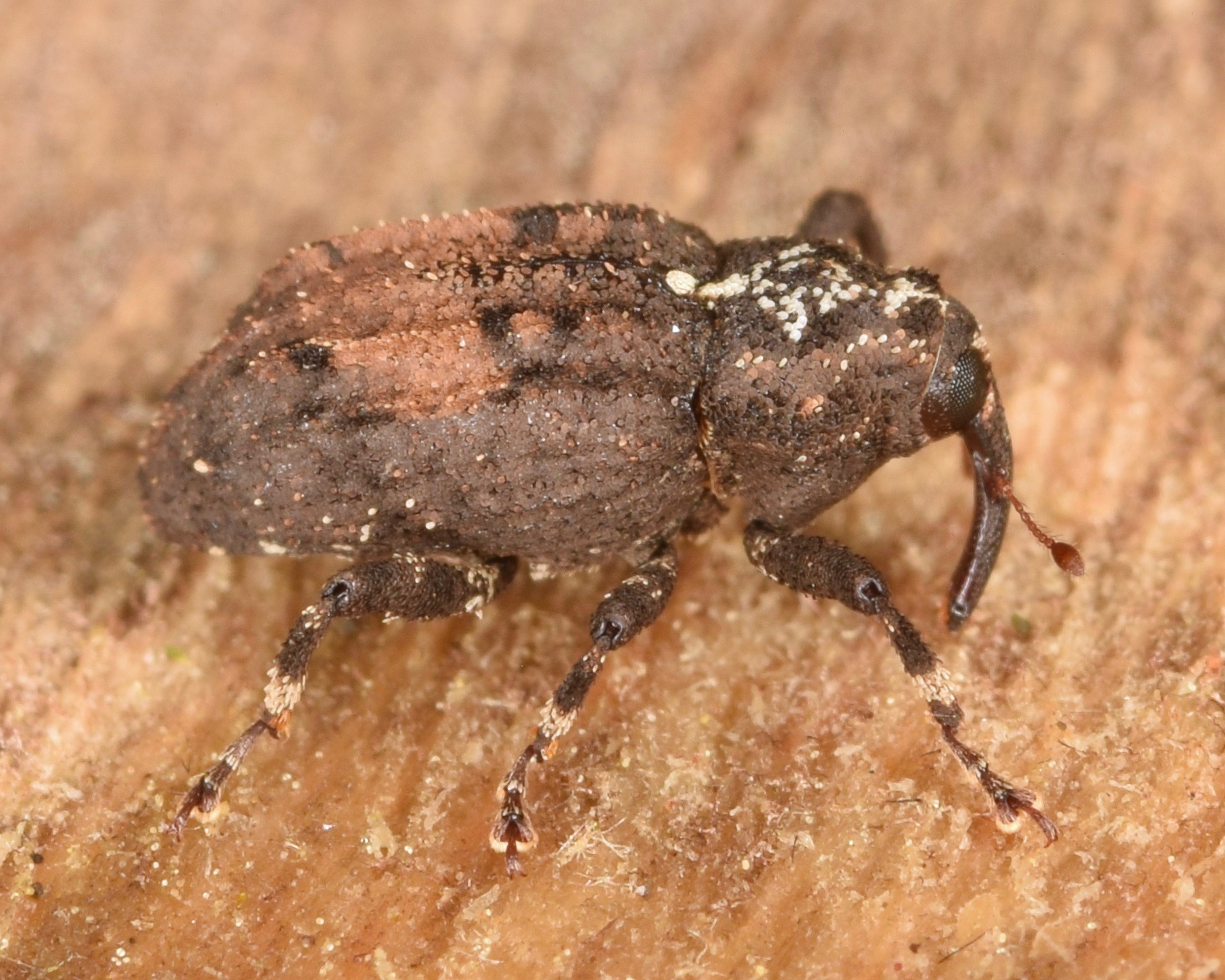

Scientific classification
- Kingdom: Animalia
- Phylum: Arthropoda
- Class: Insecta
- Order: Coleoptera
- Suborder: Polyphaga
- Infraorder: Cucujiformia
- Family: Curculionidae
- Genus: Cophes
- Species: C. obtentus

Binomial name
- Cophes obtentus (Herbst, 1797)

Synonyms
- Cryptorhynchus ypsilon Boheman, 1837

= Cophes obtentus =

Species of beetle

Cophes obtentus is a species of hidden snout weevil in the beetle family Curculionidae. It is found in North America.
