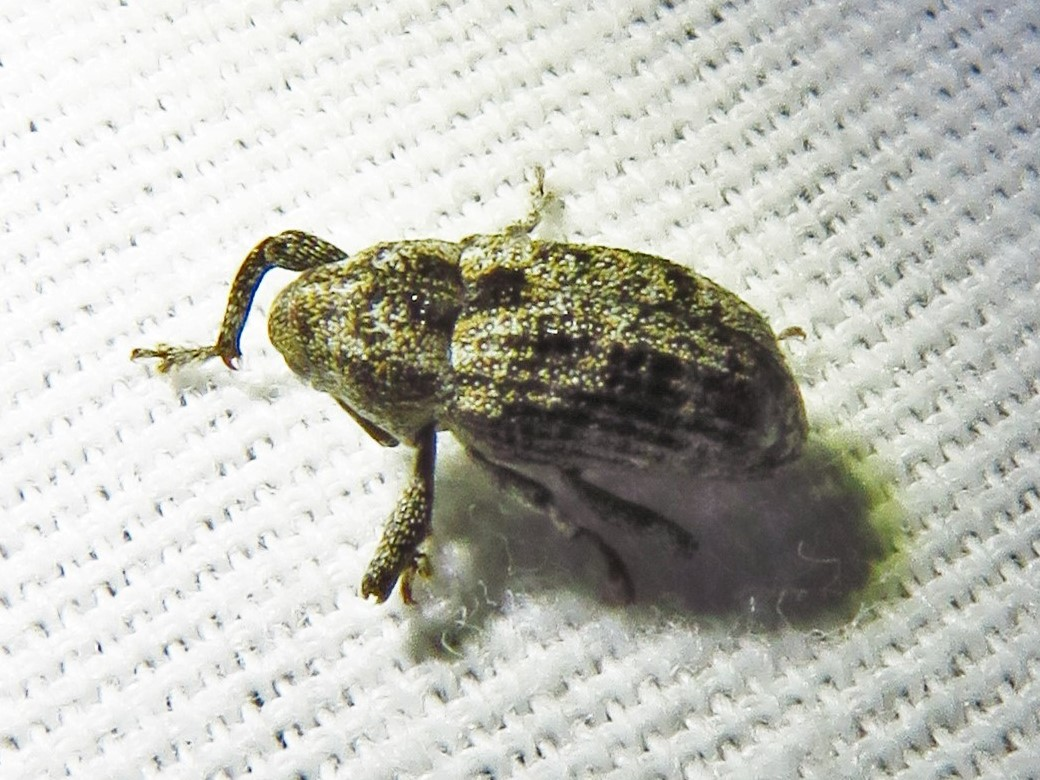

Scientific classification
- Domain: Eukaryota
- Kingdom: Animalia
- Phylum: Arthropoda
- Class: Insecta
- Order: Coleoptera
- Suborder: Polyphaga
- Infraorder: Cucujiformia
- Family: Curculionidae
- Genus: Cophes
- Species: C. texanus

Binomial name
- Cophes texanus Sleeper, 1955

= Cophes texanus =

Species of beetle

Cophes texanus is a species of hidden snout weevil in the beetle family Curculionidae.
