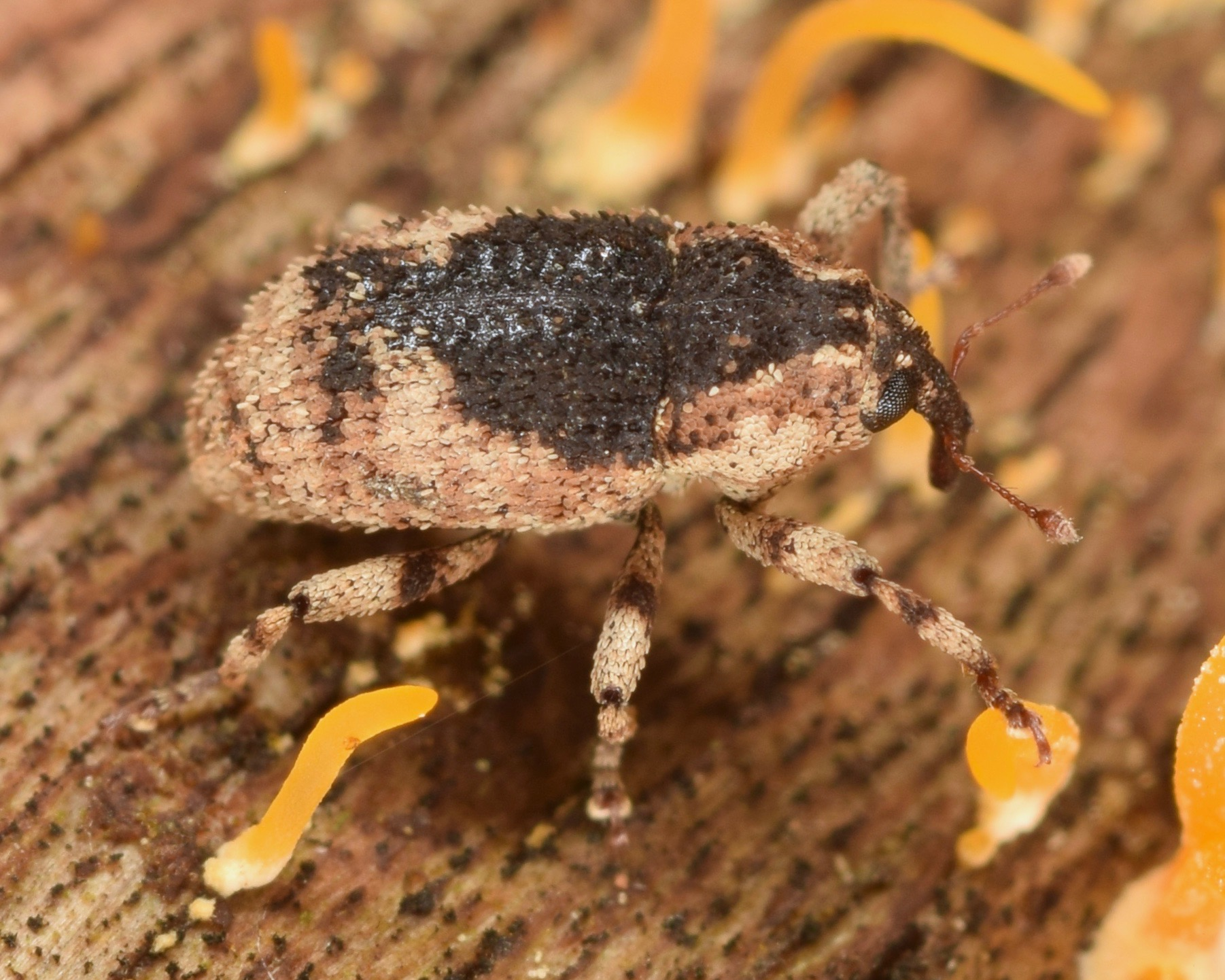
- Cophes fallax

Scientific classification
- Domain: Eukaryota
- Kingdom: Animalia
- Phylum: Arthropoda
- Class: Insecta
- Order: Coleoptera
- Suborder: Polyphaga
- Infraorder: Cucujiformia
- Family: Curculionidae
- Tribe: Gasterocercini
- Genus: Cophes; Champion, 1905

= Cophes (beetle) =

Genus of beetles

Cophes is a genus of hidden snout weevils in the family of beetles known as Curculionidae. There are about eight described species in Cophes.

== Species ==
These eight species belong to the genus Cophes:

- Cophes armipes (Boheman, 1837)^{g}
- Cophes basalis (Chevrolat, 1880)^{g}
- Cophes fallax (LeConte, 1876)^{i c b}
- Cophes grisescens (Chevrolat, 1880)^{g}
- Cophes longiusculus (Boheman, 1837)^{i c b}
- Cophes oblongus (LeConte, 1876)^{i c b}
- Cophes obtentus (Herbst, 1797)^{i c g b}
- Cophes texanus Sleeper, 1955^{i b}

Data sources: i = ITIS, c = Catalogue of Life, g = GBIF, b = Bugguide.net
