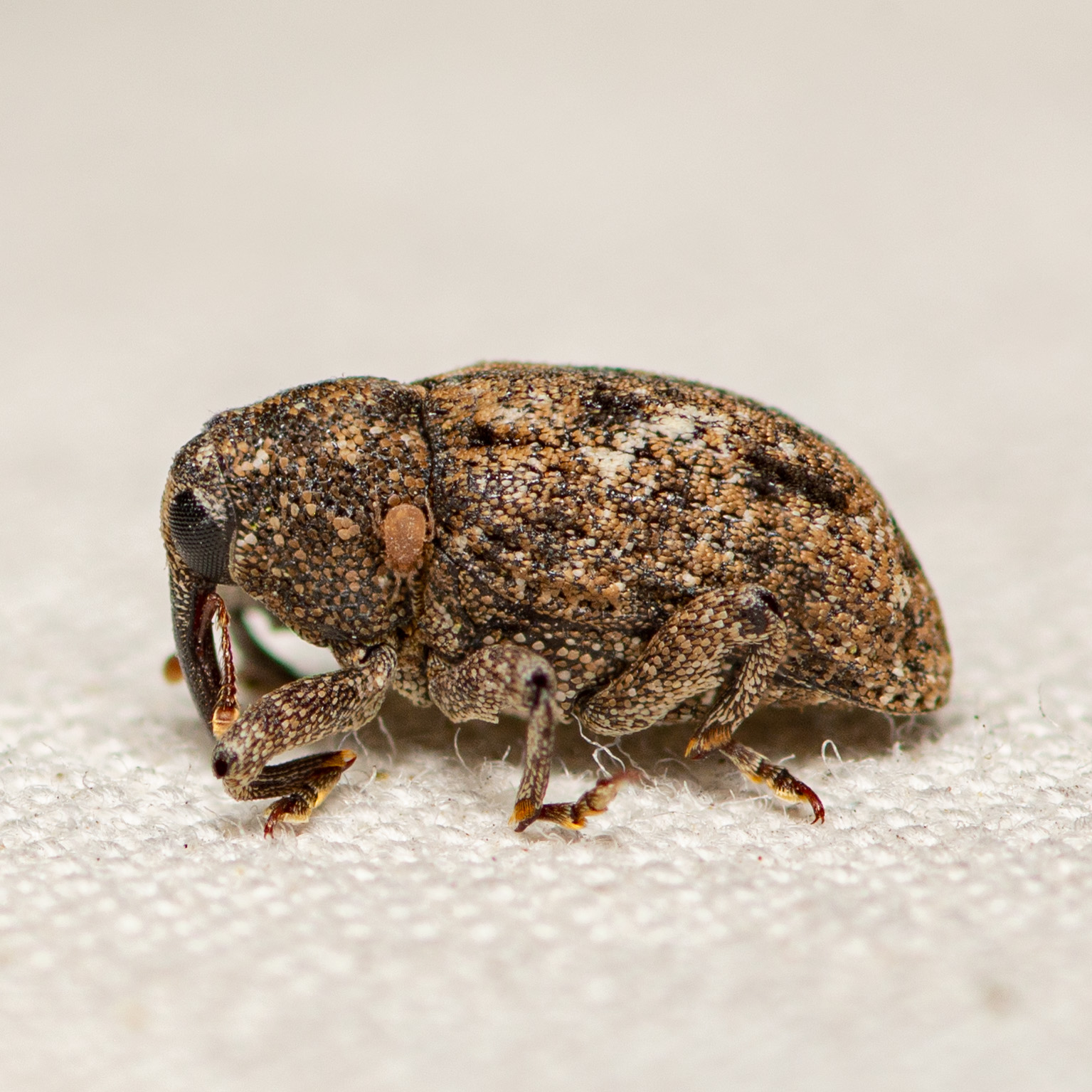
- Cophes oblongus

Scientific classification
- Kingdom: Animalia
- Phylum: Arthropoda
- Class: Insecta
- Order: Coleoptera
- Suborder: Polyphaga
- Infraorder: Cucujiformia
- Family: Curculionidae
- Genus: Cophes
- Species: C. oblongus

Binomial name
- Cophes oblongus (LeConte, 1876)

= Cophes oblongus =

Species of beetle

Cophes oblongus is a species of hidden snout weevil in the beetle family Curculionidae. It is found in North America.
