= Platychelus squamosus =

Scientific classification
- Kingdom: Animalia
- Phylum: Arthropoda
- Class: Insecta
- Order: Coleoptera
- Suborder: Polyphaga
- Infraorder: Scarabaeiformia
- Family: Scarabaeidae
- Genus: Platychelus
- Species: P. squamosus

Binomial name
- Platychelus squamosus Burmeister, 1844

Species of beetle

Platychelus squamosus is a species of beetle of the family Scarabaeidae. It is found in South Africa (Cape).

== Description ==
Adults reach a length of about 4.25 mm (0.167 in). The head has grey hairs and the antennae are red with the club and also the palpi black. The frontal part, pronotum, scutellum, elytra and the whole under side are similarly clothed in both sexes with small, closely set scales, narrower and white underneath, orange-yellow above in males, and greyish green in females. The legs are brownish red with the hairs greyish. The pronotum has sparse long black setae, which are white in the posterior edge.
