= Trigonorhinus rotundatus =

Scientific classification
- Kingdom: Animalia
- Phylum: Arthropoda
- Class: Insecta
- Order: Coleoptera
- Suborder: Polyphaga
- Infraorder: Cucujiformia
- Family: Anthribidae
- Genus: Trigonorhinus
- Species: T. rotundatus

Binomial name
- Trigonorhinus rotundatus (LeConte, 1876)

Species of beetle

Trigonorhinus rotundatus is a species of fungus weevil in the beetle family Anthribidae.
