= Pleophylla ferruginea =

Scientific classification
- Kingdom: Animalia
- Phylum: Arthropoda
- Class: Insecta
- Order: Coleoptera
- Suborder: Polyphaga
- Infraorder: Scarabaeiformia
- Family: Scarabaeidae
- Genus: Pleophylla
- Species: P. ferruginea

Binomial name
- Pleophylla ferruginea Burmeister, 1855

Species of beetle

Pleophylla ferruginea is a species of beetle of the family Scarabaeidae. It is found in South Africa.

== Description ==
Adults reach a length of about 10.3 mm. The pronotum is unicoloured and has dense and thick erect setae. The elytra have dark spots and dense, erect dorsal pilosity.
