= Trigonorhinus alternatus =

Scientific classification
- Domain: Eukaryota
- Kingdom: Animalia
- Phylum: Arthropoda
- Class: Insecta
- Order: Coleoptera
- Suborder: Polyphaga
- Infraorder: Cucujiformia
- Family: Anthribidae
- Genus: Trigonorhinus
- Species: T. alternatus

Binomial name
- Trigonorhinus alternatus (Say, 1827)

Species of beetle

Trigonorhinus alternatus is a species of fungus weevil in the beetle family Anthribidae. It is found in North America.
