= Pleophylla burundiensis =

Scientific classification
- Kingdom: Animalia
- Phylum: Arthropoda
- Class: Insecta
- Order: Coleoptera
- Suborder: Polyphaga
- Infraorder: Scarabaeiformia
- Family: Scarabaeidae
- Genus: Pleophylla
- Species: P. burundiensis

Binomial name
- Pleophylla burundiensis Ahrens, Beckett, Eberle & Fabrizi, 2017

Species of beetle

Pleophylla burundiensis is a species of beetle of the family Scarabaeidae. It is found in Burundi.

== Description ==
Adults reach a length of about 8–10.3 mm. The pronotum is unicoloured and has dense and thick erect setae. The elytra have dark spots and dense, erect dorsal pilosity.

== Etymology ==
The species is named after its occurrence in Burundi.
