= Abacetus nigrinus =

Scientific classification
- Kingdom: Animalia
- Phylum: Arthropoda
- Class: Insecta
- Order: Coleoptera
- Suborder: Adephaga
- Family: Carabidae
- Genus: Abacetus
- Species: A. nigrinus

Binomial name
- Abacetus nigrinus (Boheman, 1848)

Species of beetle

Abacetus nigrinus is a species of ground beetle in the subfamily Pterostichinae. It was described by Boheman in 1848.
