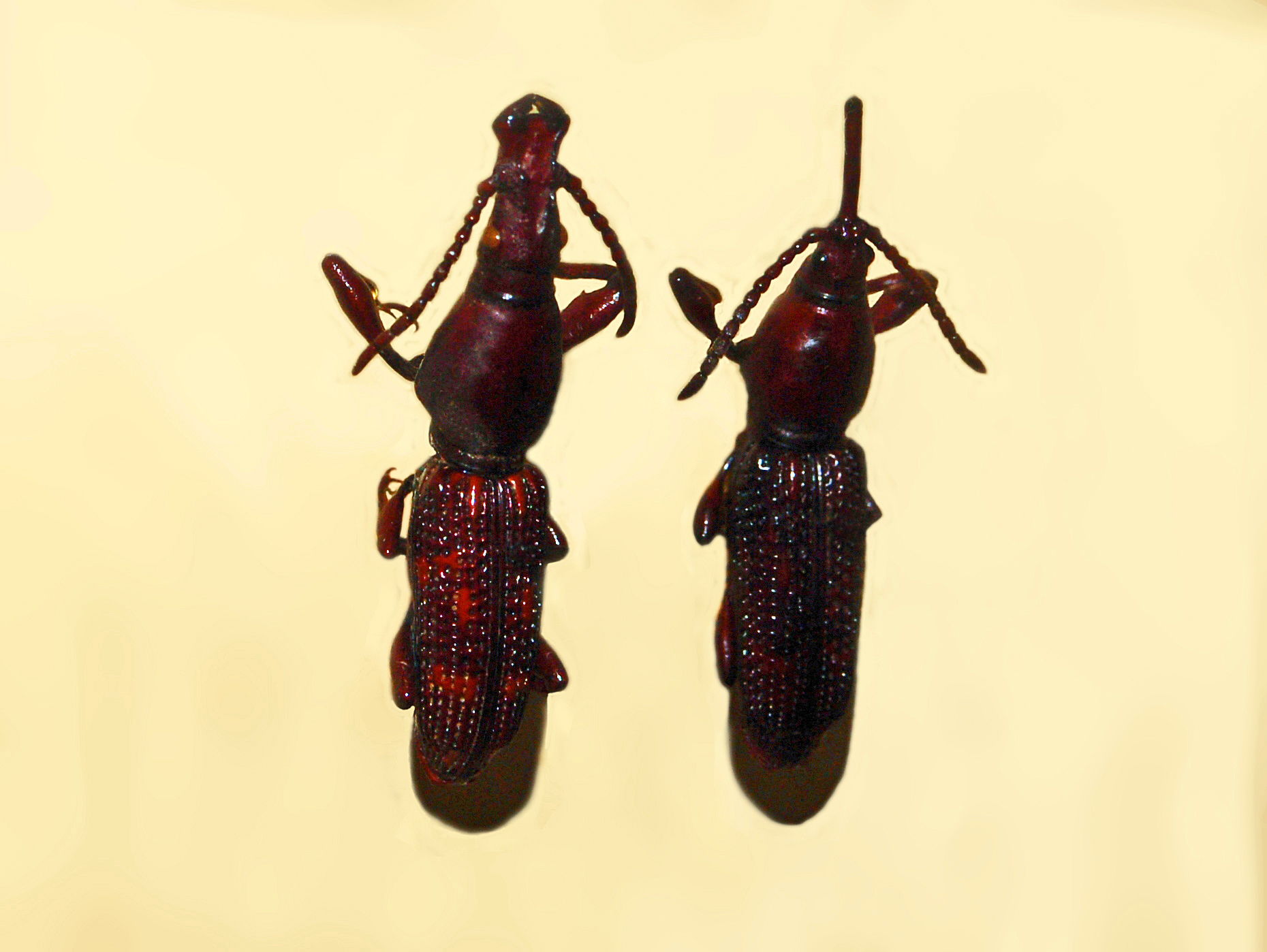
- Baryrhynchus miles from Myanmar. Male and female.

Scientific classification
- Kingdom: Animalia
- Phylum: Arthropoda
- Class: Insecta
- Order: Coleoptera
- Suborder: Polyphaga
- Infraorder: Cucujiformia
- Family: Brentidae
- Subtribe: Arrhenodina
- Genus: Baryrhynchus; Lacordaire, 1865

Synonyms
- Barryrhynchus

= Baryrhynchus =

Genus of beetle

Baryrhynchus is a genus of beetles in the family Brentidae.

== Species ==
Baryrhynchus contains the following species:

Baryrhynchus (Baryrhynchus) Lacordaire, 1865

- Baryrhynchus andamanicus Power, 1879
- Baryrhynchus angulatus Zhang, 1993
- Baryrhynchus anthracinus Kleine, 1916
- Baryrhynchus bengalensis Kleine, 1937
- Baryrhynchus concretus Zhang, 1993
- Baryrhynchus convexus Zhang, 1993
- Baryrhynchus cratus Zhang, 1993
- Baryrhynchus dehiscens (Gyllenhal, 1833)
- Baryrhynchus discolor Kleine, 1916
- Baryrhynchus latirostris (Gyllenhal, 1833)
- Baryrhynchus merocephalus Kleine, 1916
- Baryrhynchus miles (Boheman, 1845)
- Baryrhynchus minisulus Zhang, 1993
- Baryrhynchus nitidus Zhang, 1993
- Baryrhynchus odontus Zhang, 1993
- Baryrhynchus phaeus Zhang, 1993
- Baryrhynchus planus Zhang, 1993
- Baryrhynchus rudis Senna, 1893
- Baryrhynchus setulosus Zhang, 1993
- Baryrhynchus speciosissimus Kleine, 1916
- Baryrhynchus umbraticus Kleine, 1916
- Baryrhynchus yaeyamensis Morimoto, 1979

Baryrhynchus (Eupsalomimus) Kleine, 1916

- Baryrhynchus lineicollis Power, 1879
- Baryrhynchus poweri Roelofs, 1879
- Baryrhynchus tokarensis Ohbayashi and Satô, 1966

Unclear subgenera

- Baryrhynchus smetsi Goossens, 2008
