= Platychelus gravidus =

Scientific classification
- Kingdom: Animalia
- Phylum: Arthropoda
- Class: Insecta
- Order: Coleoptera
- Suborder: Polyphaga
- Infraorder: Scarabaeiformia
- Family: Scarabaeidae
- Genus: Platychelus
- Species: P. gravidus

Binomial name
- Platychelus gravidus (Burmeister, 1844)

Synonyms
- Encyophanes gravidus Burmeister, 1844

Species of beetle

Platychelus gravidus is a species of beetle of the family Scarabaeidae. It is found in South Africa (Cape, KwaZulu-Natal).

== Description ==
Adults reach a length of about 8–10 mm (0.31–0.39 in). Males are black, the pronotum clothed with a dense flavescent or whitish, slightly lanuginose pubescence. The elytra have four bands of appressed, squamulose hairs of the same colour, and the pygidium and abdomen are clothed with similar hairs. Females are smaller, narrower, and darker than males, and the squamose hairs are not so dense.
