= Pleophylla =

Scientific classification
- Kingdom: Animalia
- Phylum: Arthropoda
- Class: Insecta
- Order: Coleoptera
- Suborder: Polyphaga
- Infraorder: Scarabaeiformia
- Family: Scarabaeidae
- Tribe: Sericini
- Genus: Pleophylla; Erichson, 1847

Genus of beetles

Pleophylla is a genus of beetles in the family Scarabaeidae.

== Species ==
- Pleophylla burundiensis Ahrens, Beckett, Eberle & Fabrizi, 2017
- Pleophylla charlyi Ahrens, Beckett, Eberle & Fabrizi, 2017
- Pleophylla congoensis Ahrens, Beckett, Eberle & Fabrizi, 2017
- Pleophylla fasciatipennis Blanchard, 1850
- Pleophylla ferruginea Burmeister, 1855
- Pleophylla harrisoni Ahrens, Beckett, Eberle & Fabrizi, 2017
- Pleophylla kruegeri Ahrens, Beckett, Eberle & Fabrizi, 2017
- Pleophylla lizleri Ahrens, Beckett, Eberle & Fabrizi, 2017
- Pleophylla mlilwaneensis Ahrens, Beckett, Eberle & Fabrizi, 2017
- Pleophylla mpumalanga Ahrens, Beckett, Eberle & Fabrizi, 2017
- Pleophylla murzini Ahrens, Beckett, Eberle & Fabrizi, 2017
- Pleophylla navicularis Burmeister, 1855
- Pleophylla nelshoogteensis Ahrens, Beckett, Eberle & Fabrizi, 2017
- Pleophylla pilosa Boheman, 1857
- Pleophylla pseudopilosa Ahrens, Beckett, Eberle & Fabrizi, 2017
- Pleophylla ruthae Ahrens, Beckett, Eberle & Fabrizi, 2017
- Pleophylla settentrionalis Ahrens, Beckett, Eberle & Fabrizi, 2017
- Pleophylla silvatica Ahrens, Beckett, Eberle & Fabrizi, 2017
- Pleophylla stalsi Ahrens, Beckett, Eberle & Fabrizi, 2017
- Pleophylla taitaensis Ahrens, Beckett, Eberle & Fabrizi, 2017
- Pleophylla tongaatsana Péringuey, 1904
- Pleophylla transkeiensis Ahrens, Beckett, Eberle & Fabrizi, 2017
- Pleophylla wakkerstroomensis Ahrens, Beckett, Eberle & Fabrizi, 2017
- Pleophylla warnockae Ahrens, Beckett, Eberle & Fabrizi, 2017
