= Abacetus pygmaeus =

Scientific classification
- Kingdom: Animalia
- Phylum: Arthropoda
- Class: Insecta
- Order: Coleoptera
- Suborder: Adephaga
- Family: Carabidae
- Genus: Abacetus
- Species: A. pygmaeus

Binomial name
- Abacetus pygmaeus Boheman, 1848

Species of beetle

Abacetus pygmaeus is a species of ground beetle in the subfamily Pterostichinae. It was described by Boheman in 1848.
