= Platychelus alternans =

Scientific classification
- Kingdom: Animalia
- Phylum: Arthropoda
- Clade: Pancrustacea
- Class: Insecta
- Order: Coleoptera
- Suborder: Polyphaga
- Infraorder: Scarabaeiformia
- Family: Scarabaeidae
- Genus: Platychelus
- Species: P. alternans

Binomial name
- Platychelus alternans Burmeister, 1844

Species of beetle

Platychelus alternans is a species of beetle of the family Scarabaeidae. It is found in South Africa (Cape).

== Description ==
Adults reach a length of about 6.25 mm (0.246 in). The head is rounded in the front, is rough, pitted and bears black hairs. The antennae and the palpi are reddish brown. The plate behind the head (pronotum) has a groove running down the middle, is finely rough and pitted (scabroso-punctate). The front and middle are covered with simple black bristles (setae), and the rear has a shorter hair covering. Along the margin and in the central furrow there are some short scale-like (squamose) white hairs. Similar squamose hairs occur in the plate between the wing covers (scutellum), as also on the three furrows which run along each of the wing covers (elytra). These furrows are opaque, finely pitted, sunken and hairy. The widest groove runs along the suture, the other two grooves are one on each side of the shoulder "bump" (humeral callus), narrowing as they go and unite at the tip of the callus. The abdomen and underside of the chest (pectus) are clothed with fine, small, distant hairs.
