= Platychelus expansus =

Scientific classification
- Kingdom: Animalia
- Phylum: Arthropoda
- Class: Insecta
- Order: Coleoptera
- Suborder: Polyphaga
- Infraorder: Scarabaeiformia
- Family: Scarabaeidae
- Genus: Platychelus
- Species: P. expansus

Binomial name
- Platychelus expansus Péringuey, 1902

Species of beetle

Platychelus expansus is a species of beetle of the family Scarabaeidae. It is found in South Africa (Northern Cape).

== Description ==
Adults reach a length of about 5 mm (0.20 in). They are black, with a dark green metallic tinge on the pronotum. The head and pronotum are clothed with a fulvous erect, somewhat villose pubescence. The scutellum, propygidium, and pygidium are clothed with dense appressed fulvous hairs and the elytra are very closely punctured, and covered with a very short, erect black pubescence.
