= Platychelus intermedius =

Scientific classification
- Kingdom: Animalia
- Phylum: Arthropoda
- Class: Insecta
- Order: Coleoptera
- Suborder: Polyphaga
- Infraorder: Scarabaeiformia
- Family: Scarabaeidae
- Genus: Platychelus
- Species: P. intermedius

Binomial name
- Platychelus intermedius Blanchard, 1850

Species of beetle

Platychelus intermedius is a species of beetle of the family Scarabaeidae. It is found in South Africa (Cape).

== Description ==
Adults reach a length of about 7 mm (0.28 in). They are black, with ashy hairs. The pronotum is black, shining, punctate, sulcate behind in the middle, and with light fulvous hairs. The scutellum has ashy scales. The elytra are broad, short, entirely pale testaceous and immaculate. The legs and abdomen are red and the pygidium is hidden by fulvous hairs.
