= Camentoserica kulzeri =

Scientific classification
- Kingdom: Animalia
- Phylum: Arthropoda
- Clade: Pancrustacea
- Class: Insecta
- Order: Coleoptera
- Suborder: Polyphaga
- Infraorder: Scarabaeiformia
- Family: Scarabaeidae
- Genus: Camentoserica
- Species: C. kulzeri

Binomial name
- Camentoserica kulzeri Frey, 1969

Species of beetle

Camentoserica kulzeri is a species of beetle of the family Scarabaeidae. It is found in South Africa (Gauteng).

== Description ==
Adults reach a length of about 6–7 mm. The upper and lower surfaces are reddish-yellow and glabrous, with only a few light brown setae on the lateral margin of the metasternum. The sides of the pronotum and elytra are sparsely fringed with such setae.
