= Microplidus binotatus =

Scientific classification
- Kingdom: Animalia
- Phylum: Arthropoda
- Class: Insecta
- Order: Coleoptera
- Suborder: Polyphaga
- Infraorder: Scarabaeiformia
- Family: Scarabaeidae
- Genus: Microplidus
- Species: M. binotatus

Binomial name
- Microplidus binotatus Péringuey, 1902

Species of beetle

Microplidus binotatus is a species of beetle of the family Scarabaeidae. It is found in South Africa (KwaZulu-Natal).

== Description ==
Adults reach a length of about 6 mm (0.24 in). The head, pronotum, legs and pectus are black, while the elytra, pygidial part, and abdomen are chestnut-brown. The head is briefly pubescent and the pronotum is covered with scale-like flavescent appressed hairs, and very closely and finely punctured. The pygidium is covered with minute, elongate sub-flavescent scales and the elytra have two nearly obliterated costules on each side. They are very closely punctulate and have in each puncture a minute elongate flavescent scale, except near the suture at about the median part, where there is a small denuded round spot. On the pygidial part and on the abdomen the scales are thicker than on the elytra and more greyish.
