= Platychelus jucundus =

Scientific classification
- Kingdom: Animalia
- Phylum: Arthropoda
- Class: Insecta
- Order: Coleoptera
- Suborder: Polyphaga
- Infraorder: Scarabaeiformia
- Family: Scarabaeidae
- Genus: Platychelus
- Species: P. jucundus

Binomial name
- Platychelus jucundus Péringuey, 1902

Species of beetle

Platychelus jucundus is a species of beetle of the family Scarabaeidae. It is found in South Africa (Western Cape).

== Description ==
Adults reach a length of about 9.25 mm (0.364 in). They are greenish bronze, brighter on the plate behind the head (pronotum). The head, pronotum, rear tip (pygidial part), abdomen, underside of the chest (pectus), and legs are clothed with a long and dense greyish hair covering which is erect on the head and pronotum. The plate between the wing covers (scutellum) is also covered in hair and the surface of the wing covers (elytra) is extremely finely and closely textured, and instead of rough pits (scabrose punctures) they are covered with closely set, equi-distant, small granules from the intervals of which spring small, flat-lying, greyish hairs.
