= Platychelus pugionatus =

Scientific classification
- Kingdom: Animalia
- Phylum: Arthropoda
- Class: Insecta
- Order: Coleoptera
- Suborder: Polyphaga
- Infraorder: Scarabaeiformia
- Family: Scarabaeidae
- Genus: Platychelus
- Species: P. pugionatus

Binomial name
- Platychelus pugionatus Péringuey, 1902

Species of beetle

Platychelus pugionatus is a species of beetle of the family Scarabaeidae. It is found in South Africa (Cape).

== Description ==
Adults reach a length of about 5 mm (0.20 in). They are aeneous and shining, with the elytra light chestnut-brown, and clothed on the pronotum, the pygidial part, the under side and legs, with very long and dense light fulvous hairs. The head and clypeus are granular and the pronotum is plainly scabroso-punctate in the anterior half, normally punctate in the posterior, and has a short, shallow, basal longitudinal furrow. The scutellum is clothed with fulvous hairs and the elytra are irregularly punctulate, and nearly glabrous.
