= Platychelus anomalus =

Scientific classification
- Kingdom: Animalia
- Phylum: Arthropoda
- Class: Insecta
- Order: Coleoptera
- Suborder: Polyphaga
- Infraorder: Scarabaeiformia
- Family: Scarabaeidae
- Genus: Platychelus
- Species: P. anomalus

Binomial name
- Platychelus anomalus Burmeister, 1844

Species of beetle

Platychelus anomalus is a species of beetle of the family Scarabaeidae. It is found in South Africa (Cape).

== Description ==
Adults reach a length of about 5 mm (0.20 in). They are bronze, more shining on the pronotum than in the posterior part of the elytra, the anterior part of the latter being occupied by a transverse testaceous yellow patch reaching to near the outer margin and to the suture. The pronotum is clothed with an erect greyish pubescence which is somewhat bristly, it is closely scabroso-punctate in the anterior part, but normally punctate in the posterior. The scutellum has a greyish pubescence and the elytra are covered with broad, somewhat closely set punctures, and covered with a very short, fuscous appressed pubescence. The propygidium, pygidium, and abdomen are clothed with greyish hairs.
