= Schizonycha affinis =

Scientific classification
- Kingdom: Animalia
- Phylum: Arthropoda
- Clade: Pancrustacea
- Class: Insecta
- Order: Coleoptera
- Suborder: Polyphaga
- Infraorder: Scarabaeiformia
- Family: Scarabaeidae
- Genus: Schizonycha
- Species: S. affinis

Binomial name
- Schizonycha affinis Boheman, 1857

Synonyms
- Schizonycha natalica Moser, 1917; Schizonycha furva Péringuey, 1904; Schizonycha oblonga Boheman, 1857

Species of beetle

Schizonycha affinis is a species of beetle of the family Scarabaeidae. It is found in South Africa (KwaZulu-Natal, Northern Cape, Free State, Mpumalanga, North West) and Zimbabwe.

== Description ==
Adults reach a length of about 11 mm. They are yellowish-brown, but the head, pronotum, scutellum and legs are red. The head is robust, somewhat wrinkled and punctured and the antennae are brown. The pronotum is quite densely covered with coarse punctures, which are irregularly spaced. The punctures have minute setae, which are more distinct on the sides of the pronotum than in the middle. The elytra are covered with tiny, bristly punctures.
