= Platychelus musculus =

Scientific classification
- Kingdom: Animalia
- Phylum: Arthropoda
- Class: Insecta
- Order: Coleoptera
- Suborder: Polyphaga
- Infraorder: Scarabaeiformia
- Family: Scarabaeidae
- Genus: Platychelus
- Species: P. musculus

Binomial name
- Platychelus musculus Burmeister, 1844

Species of beetle

Platychelus musculus is a species of beetle of the family Scarabaeidae. It is found in South Africa (Cape).

== Description ==
Adults reach a length of about 4.25 mm (0.167 in). They are very similar to Platychelus litigosus, but smaller, more depressed, and has longer hairs everywhere. The clypeus is more rounded, broader, not sharp laterally, and closely punctulate like the pronotum. In females, there is a weak longitudinal furrow. The elytra are closely punctulate and are equally covered with long yellowish grey hairs. The abdomen, pectus, and legs have similar hairs. In females, the elytra, tarsi, hind legs, antennae, and palpi are red, but in males they are brown.
