= Platychelus trunculus =

Scientific classification
- Kingdom: Animalia
- Phylum: Arthropoda
- Class: Insecta
- Order: Coleoptera
- Suborder: Polyphaga
- Infraorder: Scarabaeiformia
- Family: Scarabaeidae
- Genus: Platychelus
- Species: P. trunculus

Binomial name
- Platychelus trunculus (Burmeister, 1855)

Synonyms
- Ischnochelus trunculus Burmeister, 1855

Species of beetle

Platychelus trunculus is a species of beetle of the family Scarabaeidae. It is found in South Africa (Cape).

== Description ==
Adults reach a length of about 3 mm (0.12 in). They are completely black and shining, and clothed with greyish hairs. The elytra have greyish bands, and the abdomen is very densely villose.
