= Pleophylla stalsi =

Scientific classification
- Kingdom: Animalia
- Phylum: Arthropoda
- Class: Insecta
- Order: Coleoptera
- Suborder: Polyphaga
- Infraorder: Scarabaeiformia
- Family: Scarabaeidae
- Genus: Pleophylla
- Species: P. stalsi

Binomial name
- Pleophylla stalsi Ahrens, Beckett, Eberle & Fabrizi, 2017

Species of beetle

Pleophylla stalsi is a species of beetle of the family Scarabaeidae. It is found in South Africa (Mpumalanga).

== Description ==
Adults reach a length of about 9.9–10.4 mm. The pronotum is unicoloured and nearly glabrous. The elytra have dark spots and dense, erect dorsal pilosity.

== Etymology ==
The species is named after Riaan Stals.
