= Euides =

- Euides basilinea.

Scientific classification
- Kingdom: Animalia
- Phylum: Arthropoda
- Clade: Pancrustacea
- Class: Insecta
- Order: Hemiptera
- Suborder: Auchenorrhyncha
- Infraorder: Fulgoromorpha
- Family: Delphacidae
- Genus: Euides; Fieber, 1866

Genus of planthoppers

Euides is a genus of planthoppers belonging to the family Delphacidae.

The genus was first described by Fieber in 1866.

The species of this genus are found in Europe and Northern America.

Species:

- Euides speciosa (Boheman, 1845)
