= Microplidus algoensis =

Scientific classification
- Kingdom: Animalia
- Phylum: Arthropoda
- Class: Insecta
- Order: Coleoptera
- Suborder: Polyphaga
- Infraorder: Scarabaeiformia
- Family: Scarabaeidae
- Genus: Microplidus
- Species: M. algoensis

Binomial name
- Microplidus algoensis Péringuey, 1902

Species of beetle

Microplidus algoensis is a species of beetle of the family Scarabaeidae. It is found in Mozambique.

== Description ==
Adults reach a length of about 8 mm (0.31 in). They are chestnut-brown, clothed above and underneath with a somewhat dense appressed greyish pubescence assuming on the elytra a somewhat squamiform appearance. The antennae are rufescent and the clypeus, head, and pronotum are normally punctured and scabrose. The legs are very pubescent.
