= Platychelus discolor =

Scientific classification
- Kingdom: Animalia
- Phylum: Arthropoda
- Class: Insecta
- Order: Coleoptera
- Suborder: Polyphaga
- Infraorder: Scarabaeiformia
- Family: Scarabaeidae
- Genus: Platychelus
- Species: P. discolor

Binomial name
- Platychelus discolor Burmeister, 1844

Species of beetle

Platychelus discolor is a species of beetle of the family Scarabaeidae. It is found in South Africa (Eastern Cape).

== Description ==
Adults reach a length of about 5–5.25 mm (0.197–0.207 in). Males are bronze and shining, darker on the elytra than on the pronotum. The head and pronotum are clothed with a moderately long, dense, sub-flavescent pubescence, while the elytra are moderately densely pubescent along the margin, and in the basal discoidal impression. The pygidial part, abdomen, and legs are clothed with dense, yellow, appressed hairs. Females have the same shape as the males, but the elytra are red, the pronotum greener, and the pubescence on it is not as long as in males, the appressed hairs are more evenly spread and do not form a band along the suture.
