= Schizonycha valida =

Scientific classification
- Kingdom: Animalia
- Phylum: Arthropoda
- Clade: Pancrustacea
- Class: Insecta
- Order: Coleoptera
- Suborder: Polyphaga
- Infraorder: Scarabaeiformia
- Family: Scarabaeidae
- Genus: Schizonycha
- Species: S. valida

Binomial name
- Schizonycha valida Boheman, 1857

Species of beetle

Schizonycha valida is a species of beetle of the family Scarabaeidae. It is found in South Africa (North West, Gauteng, Limpopo), Namibia and Zimbabwe.

== Description ==
Adults reach a length of about 13.5–20 mm (0.53–0.79 in). They are rusty or chestnut-brown, somewhat pale testaceous. The hair in each puncture is most minute on the upper side and the pectus is densely villose. They vary very much in size, colour, and sculpture.
