= Platychelus semivirgatus =

Scientific classification
- Kingdom: Animalia
- Phylum: Arthropoda
- Class: Insecta
- Order: Coleoptera
- Suborder: Polyphaga
- Infraorder: Scarabaeiformia
- Family: Scarabaeidae
- Genus: Platychelus
- Species: P. semivirgatus

Binomial name
- Platychelus semivirgatus Burmeister, 1844

Species of beetle

Platychelus semivirgatus is a species of beetle of the family Scarabaeidae. It is found in South Africa (Cape).

== Description ==
Adults reach a length of about 5–7.5 mm (0.20–0.30 in). Males are black, with an aeneous sheen more noticeable on the sides of the elytra and on the legs. The head and pronotum are clothed with a long greyish erect pubescence. The elytra have a distinct sutural and apical band of white, appressed, slightly squamulose hairs obliterated close to the apex of the scutellum. There is also a faint trace of a discoidal and of a supra-marginal line of similar hairs. The pygidial part and abdomen are covered with appressed hairs, which are more flavescent on the pygidium than on the abdomen. Females are exactly like the males, but a little more robust. They can be distinguished by the shape of the pygidium only.
