= Platychelus lupinus =

Scientific classification
- Kingdom: Animalia
- Phylum: Arthropoda
- Class: Insecta
- Order: Coleoptera
- Suborder: Polyphaga
- Infraorder: Scarabaeiformia
- Family: Scarabaeidae
- Genus: Platychelus
- Species: P. lupinus

Binomial name
- Platychelus lupinus Burmeister, 1844

Species of beetle

Platychelus lupinus is a species of beetle of the family Scarabaeidae. It is found in South Africa (Western Cape).

== Description ==
Adults reach a length of about 7–8 mm (0.28–0.31 in). Males are black with a bronze tinge, and the elytra are very light testaceous and slightly infuscate in the apical part. The head and pronotum are clothed with a very long, villose, light fulvous pubescence, which is nearly equally as long and dense on the abdomen and the pectus. The punctures on the pronotum are not scabrose in the posterior half, and there is no median groove. The scutellum is densely hairy and the elytra are covered with somewhat closely set, round, somewhat seriate punctures, each bearing a fine sub-appressed, pallid hair. At the apex of the suture there is a short band of denser paler hairs on each side. The pygidium is very closely and very finely punctulate, and covered with a slight pallid pubescence which does not conceal the black background. Females are similar to males, but the elytra are not infuscate behind.
