= Platychelus unguiculatus =

Scientific classification
- Kingdom: Animalia
- Phylum: Arthropoda
- Class: Insecta
- Order: Coleoptera
- Suborder: Polyphaga
- Infraorder: Scarabaeiformia
- Family: Scarabaeidae
- Genus: Platychelus
- Species: P. unguiculatus

Binomial name
- Platychelus unguiculatus Péringuey, 1902

Species of beetle

Platychelus unguiculatus is a species of beetle of the family Scarabaeidae. It is found in South Africa (Western Cape).

== Description ==
Adults reach a length of about 5–6.25 mm (0.197–0.246 in). They are black, with the elytra and legs red and shining. The head and pronotum are clothed with villose sub-flavescent hairs and the elytra are moderately densely pubescent. The pubescence is somewhat greyish, but along the suture and the apical margin there is a band of denser and longer white hairs turning to yellow on the apical margin. The pygidium is clothed with very dense, appressed flavescent squamose hairs.
