= Platychelus melanurus =

Scientific classification
- Kingdom: Animalia
- Phylum: Arthropoda
- Class: Insecta
- Order: Coleoptera
- Suborder: Polyphaga
- Infraorder: Scarabaeiformia
- Family: Scarabaeidae
- Genus: Platychelus
- Species: P. melanurus

Binomial name
- Platychelus melanurus Burmeister, 1844

Species of beetle

Platychelus melanurus is a species of beetle of the family Scarabaeidae. It is found in South Africa (Northern Cape).

== Description ==
Adults reach a length of about 2.6 mm (0.10 in). They are black and shining, with long hairs. The hairs on the sides of the abdomen are white. The head is thickly punctate, the apical margin raised in the middle and very sharp laterally in the male. The pronotum has rugose, sparse punctures, and has long hairs. The scutellum is also punctate, but has short hairs. The elytra are testaceous, those of the male convex and infuscate at the apex. The pygidial part and legs are also brown and clothed with greyish hairs. The antennae are entirely black.
