= Platychelus hoploides =

Scientific classification
- Kingdom: Animalia
- Phylum: Arthropoda
- Class: Insecta
- Order: Coleoptera
- Suborder: Polyphaga
- Infraorder: Scarabaeiformia
- Family: Scarabaeidae
- Genus: Platychelus
- Species: P. hoploides

Binomial name
- Platychelus hoploides Burmeister, 1844

Species of beetle

Platychelus hoploides is a species of beetle of the family Scarabaeidae. It is found in South Africa (Western Cape).

== Description ==
Adults reach a length of about 7–10 mm (0.28–0.39 in). Males are black, with a faint aeneous tinge. The elytra are either fuscous, dark chestnut, or reddish brown, but with a slight metallic tinge. The head is granulose and the pronotum is very closely scabrose, except in the median posterior part, where the punctures are rounder and clothed with a very dense, slightly flavescent, or sometimes fulvous, erect pubescence. The scutellum is clothed with a long, appressed pubescence. The elytra are covered with very closely set scabrose punctures each bearing an appressed greyish hair forming a dense pubescence. The pygidial part and abdomen are also similarly punctured and equally pubescent. Females are similar to males, and only recognisable by the shape of the pygidium, which is a little convex, and vertical. Generally, the appressed pubescence on the elytra is not quite so dense as in males.
