= Schizonycha continens =

Scientific classification
- Kingdom: Animalia
- Phylum: Arthropoda
- Clade: Pancrustacea
- Class: Insecta
- Order: Coleoptera
- Suborder: Polyphaga
- Infraorder: Scarabaeiformia
- Family: Scarabaeidae
- Genus: Schizonycha
- Species: S. continens

Binomial name
- Schizonycha continens Péringuey, 1904

Species of beetle

Schizonycha continens is a species of beetle of the family Scarabaeidae. It is found in South Africa (Mpumalanga, Gauteng, Limpopo) and Zimbabwe.

== Description ==
Adults reach a length of about 12.25–13 mm (0.482–0.512 in). They are similar to Schizonycha valida, with nearly the same shape and also with a ferruginous colour, a fuscous head and pronotum and ferruginous antennae.
