= Platychelus dimidiatus =

Scientific classification
- Kingdom: Animalia
- Phylum: Arthropoda
- Class: Insecta
- Order: Coleoptera
- Suborder: Polyphaga
- Infraorder: Scarabaeiformia
- Family: Scarabaeidae
- Genus: Platychelus
- Species: P. dimidiatus

Binomial name
- Platychelus dimidiatus Burmeister, 1844

Species of beetle

Platychelus dimidiatus is a species of beetle of the family Scarabaeidae. It is found in South Africa (Cape).

== Description ==
Adults reach a length of about 6–6.5 mm (0.24–0.26 in). The head and pronotum are shining bronze, while the legs and under side are metallic black and shining. The elytra are light testaceous, somewhat broadly infuscate laterally in the male, but not in the female. The pygidium has a few small greyish appressed hairs in the male, densely hairy with the hairs yellow in the female.
