= Carl Henrik Boheman =

Swedish entomologist

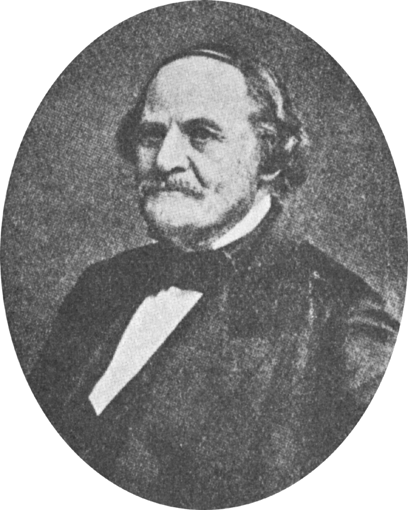
- Born: 10 July 1796; Jönköping, Sweden
- Died: 2 November 1868 (aged 72); Stockholm, Sweden
- Education: Lund University
- Occupation: Entomologist

Carl Henrik Boheman (10 July 1796 – 2 November 1868) was a Swedish entomologist. He collected specimens in Norway and became a curator of the Swedish museum of natural history and described numerous beetle species.

== Life and work ==
Boheman was born in Jönköping, the son of mystic Carl Adolf Andersson Boheman who was involved in Freemasonry and made money in England and Copenhagen. Boheman was to become a merchant and apprenticed to Nils Westrin, a student of Linnaeus and Thunberg who collected insects. This made him interested in insects at an early age and he studied Latin. He studied law at Lund University but quit in 1813 and joined the Jönköping Regiment and trained as an officer, participating in the invasion of Norway in 1814. He collected insect specimens through his travels. He was called by the Royal Swedish Academy of Sciences in 1841 to the position of professor and keeper of the Department of Entomology of the Swedish Museum of Natural History in Stockholm. He had been made a member of the Academy in 1838. He retired from the Museum in 1867.

Boheman was a specialist in coleoptera, and particularly in Chrysomelidae and Rhynchophora, he collaborated in particular with Carl Johan Schönherr (1772–1848) in his great work on Curculionidae. His other works included Årsberättelse om framstegen I insekternas myria ach arachnidernas naturalhistoria under åren 1845 och 1846 (1847), Insecta Caffraria (two volumes, 1848–1857), Monographia Cassididarum Holmiæ (four volumes, 1850–1862) and the ninth part, devoted to Cassidinae, in Catalogue of coleopterous insects in the collection of the British Museum (1856). Boheman who wrote 49 important papers described many common species some from San Francisco, California taken on the 1851–1853 expedition voyage of the Eugenie Kongliga Svenska Fregatten Eugenies Resa Omring Jorden, Entomologiska Bidrag (1858–1859), as well as very many other North American Coleoptera.

His grandson was diplomat Erik Boheman and his great-grandson was actor Erland Josephson.

== Works ==
Partial list

- Insecta Caffrariae annis 1838–1845 a J.A. Wahlberg collecta. Coleoptera. Holmiae : Fritze & Norstedt Vol. 1 8 + 625 pp.(1851).
- Monographia Cassididarum (in four parts)
