= Mesotrochalus aequalis =

Scientific classification
- Kingdom: Animalia
- Phylum: Arthropoda
- Clade: Pancrustacea
- Class: Insecta
- Order: Coleoptera
- Suborder: Polyphaga
- Infraorder: Scarabaeiformia
- Family: Scarabaeidae
- Genus: Mesotrochalus
- Species: M. aequalis

Binomial name
- Mesotrochalus aequalis Kolbe, 1914

Species of beetle

Mesotrochalus aequalis is a species of beetle of the family Scarabaeidae. It is found in the Democratic Republic of the Congo.

== Description ==
Adults reach a length of about 8.5 mm (0.33 in). They are similar to Mesotrochalus docilis, but the elytral striae are of equal width (equidistant from each other). The pronotum is very similar, perhaps somewhat more densely, but distinctly more deeply punctate. The posterior angles are approximately right-angled, with the angle distinctly sharper. The elytra are somewhat wider posteriorly and the pygidium is more finely punctate.
