= Neoserica runsorica =

Scientific classification
- Kingdom: Animalia
- Phylum: Arthropoda
- Clade: Pancrustacea
- Class: Insecta
- Order: Coleoptera
- Suborder: Polyphaga
- Infraorder: Scarabaeiformia
- Family: Scarabaeidae
- Genus: Neoserica
- Species: N. runsorica

Binomial name
- Neoserica runsorica (Kolbe, 1914)

Synonyms
- Lepiserica runsorica Kolbe, 1914; Autoserica runsorica

Species of beetle

Neoserica runsorica is a species of beetle of the family Scarabaeidae. It is found in the Democratic Republic of the Congo.

== Description ==
Adults reach a length of about 10 mm (0.39 in). They are very similar to Neoserica fullonica. They are blackish-dark green to brownish-black, with the margins of the pronotum and elytra brown. The underside is brown, partly iridescent, and very sparsely covered with very short grey hairs.
