= Neoserica wavuana =

Scientific classification
- Kingdom: Animalia
- Phylum: Arthropoda
- Clade: Pancrustacea
- Class: Insecta
- Order: Coleoptera
- Suborder: Polyphaga
- Infraorder: Scarabaeiformia
- Family: Scarabaeidae
- Genus: Neoserica
- Species: N. wavuana

Binomial name
- Neoserica wavuana (Kolbe, 1914)

Synonyms
- Lepiserica wavuana Kolbe, 1914; Autoserica wavuana

Species of beetle

Neoserica wavuana is a species of beetle of the family Scarabaeidae. It is found in Burundi and Rwanda.

== Description ==
Adults reach a length of about 8 mm (0.31 in). They are very similar to Neoserica benigna in size, shape and colour. They are blackish-brown, somewhat shinier and iridescent on the upper surface. The outer margin of the pronotum and elytra is brown. The pronotum is straight posteriorly at the sides, the lateral corners shorter and less pointed. The punctation is abundant, similar to that of benigna, but stronger and denser posteriorly. The elytra are very similar in structure and the larger white scale-like hairs are even more sparse than in benigna. The pygidium is convex, densely punctate, and has a median longitudinal ridge on the apical half. The underside is brown.
