= Schizonycha mussitans =

Scientific classification
- Kingdom: Animalia
- Phylum: Arthropoda
- Clade: Pancrustacea
- Class: Insecta
- Order: Coleoptera
- Suborder: Polyphaga
- Infraorder: Scarabaeiformia
- Family: Scarabaeidae
- Genus: Schizonycha
- Species: S. mussitans

Binomial name
- Schizonycha mussitans (Kolbe, 1914)

Synonyms
- Etischiza mussitans Kolbe, 1914

Species of beetle

Schizonycha mussitans is a species of beetle of the family Scarabaeidae. It is found in Tanzania.

== Description ==
Adults reach a length of about 10 mm (0.39 in). They are similar to Schizonycha heudelotii, but the pronotum is more densely punctate anteriorly and the pygidium is smaller, and more densely punctate.
