= Neoserica latipes =

Scientific classification
- Kingdom: Animalia
- Phylum: Arthropoda
- Class: Insecta
- Order: Coleoptera
- Suborder: Polyphaga
- Infraorder: Scarabaeiformia
- Family: Scarabaeidae
- Genus: Neoserica
- Species: N. latipes

Binomial name
- Neoserica latipes (Kolbe, 1883)

Synonyms
- Serica latipes Kolbe, 1883; Autoserica latipes

Species of beetle

Neoserica latipes is a species of beetle of the family Scarabaeidae. It is found in Angola.

== Description ==
Adults reach a length of about 8.25 mm. They have a brownish-red, dull, oblong-oval body. The elytra are punctate in rows, with very fine hairs only at the base. The scutellum is similarly finely pubescent.
