= Schizonycha granulicollis =

Scientific classification
- Kingdom: Animalia
- Phylum: Arthropoda
- Clade: Pancrustacea
- Class: Insecta
- Order: Coleoptera
- Suborder: Polyphaga
- Infraorder: Scarabaeiformia
- Family: Scarabaeidae
- Genus: Schizonycha
- Species: S. granulicollis

Binomial name
- Schizonycha granulicollis Kolbe, 1914

Species of beetle

Schizonycha granulicollis is a species of beetle of the family Scarabaeidae. It is found in Tanzania.

== Description ==
Adults reach a length of about 13 mm (0.51 in). They have a cylindrical, elongated, brownish-yellow body, with the head and pronotum brown and the tibiae and tarsi reddish-brown. The head and pronotum are finely and densely bristled. The elytra are less densely bristled, with the bristles appressed and yellowish-white. The pygidium has fine yellow and erect hairs. The thorax has moderately dense, appressed setae and the abdomen is covered with shorter, yellowish-white, scattered setae.
