= Stenoserica falsa =

Scientific classification
- Kingdom: Animalia
- Phylum: Arthropoda
- Class: Insecta
- Order: Coleoptera
- Suborder: Polyphaga
- Infraorder: Scarabaeiformia
- Family: Scarabaeidae
- Genus: Stenoserica
- Species: S. falsa

Binomial name
- Stenoserica falsa Brenske, 1901

Species of beetle

Stenoserica falsa is a species of beetle of the family Scarabaeidae. It is found in Malawi.

== Description ==
Adults reach a length of about 4.5–5 mm. They are very similar to Stenoserica kolbei, but more golden yellow, smaller and more delicate. There is a fine longitudinal line on the frons. The elytra are densely, finely and irregularly punctate in the furrows, with narrow and convex intervals.
