= Schizonycha kiwuana =

Scientific classification
- Kingdom: Animalia
- Phylum: Arthropoda
- Clade: Pancrustacea
- Class: Insecta
- Order: Coleoptera
- Suborder: Polyphaga
- Infraorder: Scarabaeiformia
- Family: Scarabaeidae
- Genus: Schizonycha
- Species: S. kiwuana

Binomial name
- Schizonycha kiwuana Kolbe, 1914

Species of beetle

Schizonycha kiwuana is a species of beetle of the family Scarabaeidae. It is found in Rwanda and Burundi.

== Description ==
Adults reach a length of about 15–18 mm (0.59–0.71 in). They are similar to Schizonycha nyassica and related species which are characterized by their narrow, almost cylindrical body. It may be distinguished from these species by the three toothed tibiae of the forelegs. They are most similar to Schizonycha elongatula, but even more elongated. The frons is less densely punctate than in this species. The elytra are somewhat more finely punctate and fine, scattered scale-like setae, which are distinct in elongatula, are absent. No scale-like setae are found on the underside either. The thorax, in particular, is covered with fine, long hairs.
