= Pseudotrochalus nigroviridis =

Scientific classification
- Kingdom: Animalia
- Phylum: Arthropoda
- Clade: Pancrustacea
- Class: Insecta
- Order: Coleoptera
- Suborder: Polyphaga
- Infraorder: Scarabaeiformia
- Family: Scarabaeidae
- Genus: Pseudotrochalus
- Species: P. nigroviridis

Binomial name
- Pseudotrochalus nigroviridis Kolbe, 1914

Species of beetle

Pseudotrochalus nigroviridis is a species of beetle of the family Scarabaeidae. It is found in Tanzania and the Democratic Republic of the Congo.

== Description ==
Adults reach a length of about 7.5 mm (0.30 in). They have a short-oval, entirely blackish-green body. They are dull above, partly with a brownish sheen. The head is weakly glossy and the mouthparts and antennae are reddish-brown. The underside of the body is weakly glossy and the legs are blackish-green.
