= Pseudotrochalus amitinus =

Scientific classification
- Kingdom: Animalia
- Phylum: Arthropoda
- Clade: Pancrustacea
- Class: Insecta
- Order: Coleoptera
- Suborder: Polyphaga
- Infraorder: Scarabaeiformia
- Family: Scarabaeidae
- Genus: Pseudotrochalus
- Species: P. amitinus

Binomial name
- Pseudotrochalus amitinus Kolbe, 1914

Species of beetle

Pseudotrochalus amitinus is a species of beetle of the family Scarabaeidae. It is found in Tanzania.

== Description ==
Adults reach a length of about 7.5 mm (0.30 in). They are similar to Pseudotrochalus concolor. They have a short-oval, entirely light reddish-brown, dull body, the head and pronotum with a very faint greenish sheen. The pronotum is somewhat longer, more strongly narrowed anteriorly, less curved laterally than in concolor. The anterior angles are pointedly projecting and are finely, but not densely punctate everywhere. The scutellum is somewhat narrower than in concolor. The elytra are widest behind the middle and striated.
