= Pseudhammus myrmidonum =

Scientific classification
- Kingdom: Animalia
- Phylum: Arthropoda
- Class: Insecta
- Order: Coleoptera
- Suborder: Polyphaga
- Infraorder: Cucujiformia
- Family: Cerambycidae
- Genus: Pseudhammus
- Species: P. myrmidonum

Binomial name
- Pseudhammus myrmidonum Kolbe, 1894

Synonyms
- Pseudhammus harpax Dillon & Dillon, 1959; Pseudhammus harpax Kolbe, 1894; Pseudhammus myrmidonum Dillon & Dillon, 1959; Pseudhammus myrmidonum Téocchi, Jiroux & Sudre, 2004

Species of beetle

Pseudhammus myrmidonum is a species of beetle in the family Cerambycidae. It was described by Hermann Julius Kolbe in 1894.
