= Oberea elegantula =

Scientific classification
- Domain: Eukaryota
- Kingdom: Animalia
- Phylum: Arthropoda
- Class: Insecta
- Order: Coleoptera
- Suborder: Polyphaga
- Infraorder: Cucujiformia
- Family: Cerambycidae
- Genus: Oberea
- Species: O. elegantula

Binomial name
- Oberea elegantula Kolbe, 1894

Species of beetle

Oberea elegantula is a species of beetle in the family Cerambycidae. It was described by Hermann Julius Kolbe in 1894.
