= Schizonycha bukobana =

Scientific classification
- Kingdom: Animalia
- Phylum: Arthropoda
- Clade: Pancrustacea
- Class: Insecta
- Order: Coleoptera
- Suborder: Polyphaga
- Infraorder: Scarabaeiformia
- Family: Scarabaeidae
- Genus: Schizonycha
- Species: S. bukobana

Binomial name
- Schizonycha bukobana Kolbe, 1914

Species of beetle

Schizonycha bukobana is a species of beetle of the family Scarabaeidae. It is found in Tanzania.

== Description ==
Adults reach a length of about 13 mm (0.51 in). They are similar to Schizonycha propinqua. They are less slender, but of the same size, colour, and luster on the upper surface. The head is somewhat broader, but equally sculpted. The antennae and palps are almost identically formed. The extremely similar pronotum is less sparsely and less coarsely punctate. The punctures of the elytra are also less widely spaced and therefore more numerous. The pygidium is more densely punctate. The pubescence of the underside is finer and more sparse.
