= Pterolophia plicata =

Scientific classification
- Kingdom: Animalia
- Phylum: Arthropoda
- Clade: Pancrustacea
- Class: Insecta
- Order: Coleoptera
- Suborder: Polyphaga
- Infraorder: Cucujiformia
- Family: Cerambycidae
- Genus: Pterolophia
- Species: P. plicata

Binomial name
- Pterolophia plicata (Kolbe, 1893)

Synonyms
- Praonetha plicata Kolbe, 1893

Species of beetle

Pterolophia plicata is a species of beetle in the family Cerambycidae. It was described by Hermann Julius Kolbe in 1893.
