= Lepitrichula vagans =

Scientific classification
- Kingdom: Animalia
- Phylum: Arthropoda
- Class: Insecta
- Order: Coleoptera
- Suborder: Polyphaga
- Infraorder: Scarabaeiformia
- Family: Scarabaeidae
- Genus: Lepitrichula
- Species: L. vagans

Binomial name
- Lepitrichula vagans (Kolbe, 1891)

Synonyms
- Monochelus vagans Kolbe, 1891

Species of beetle

Lepitrichula vagans is a species of beetle of the family Scarabaeidae. It is found in Tanzania.

== Description ==
Adults reach a length of about 4.5–6 mm (0.18–0.24 in). They are black with reddish-brown forelegs, and sometimes with reddish-brown elytra. The antennae are brown. There are white scales that form a transverse band behind the middle of the elytra, composed of a total of four spots. Furthermore, there are individual scales on both the pronotum and elytra.
