= Stenoserica deceptor =

Scientific classification
- Kingdom: Animalia
- Phylum: Arthropoda
- Class: Insecta
- Order: Coleoptera
- Suborder: Polyphaga
- Infraorder: Scarabaeiformia
- Family: Scarabaeidae
- Genus: Stenoserica
- Species: S. deceptor

Binomial name
- Stenoserica deceptor (Péringuey, 1892)

Synonyms
- Serica deceptor Péringuey, 1892

Species of beetle

Stenoserica deceptor is a species of beetle of the family Scarabaeidae. It is found in Namibia and Zimbabwe.

== Description ==
Adults reach a length of about 6.5–7 mm. They are similar to Stenoserica delagoana, but differ in colour, which is either reddish or chestnut-red. Furthermore, the club of the antennae is longer in males and the sculpture on the clypeus, head, prothorax, and antennae is much deeper. The costules on the elytra are also much more pronounced, and the intervals much more deeply punctured.
