= Schizonycha attenuata =

Scientific classification
- Kingdom: Animalia
- Phylum: Arthropoda
- Clade: Pancrustacea
- Class: Insecta
- Order: Coleoptera
- Suborder: Polyphaga
- Infraorder: Scarabaeiformia
- Family: Scarabaeidae
- Genus: Schizonycha
- Species: S. attenuata

Binomial name
- Schizonycha attenuata Kolbe, 1914

Species of beetle

Schizonycha attenuata is a species of beetle of the family Scarabaeidae. It is found in Tanzania.

== Description ==
Adults reach a length of about 12.5 mm (0.49 in). They have a light ferrugineus, shiny, narrow, elongated body. The elytra, head, pronotum, tarsi and tibiae are reddish.
