= Neonitocris nigripes =

Scientific classification
- Domain: Eukaryota
- Kingdom: Animalia
- Phylum: Arthropoda
- Class: Insecta
- Order: Coleoptera
- Suborder: Polyphaga
- Infraorder: Cucujiformia
- Family: Cerambycidae
- Genus: Neonitocris
- Species: N. nigripes

Binomial name
- Neonitocris nigripes (Kolbe, 1893)

Species of beetle

Neonitocris nigripes is a species of beetle in the family Cerambycidae. It was described by Hermann Julius Kolbe in 1893.
