= Triacmoserica stegmanni =

Scientific classification
- Kingdom: Animalia
- Phylum: Arthropoda
- Clade: Pancrustacea
- Class: Insecta
- Order: Coleoptera
- Suborder: Polyphaga
- Infraorder: Scarabaeiformia
- Family: Scarabaeidae
- Genus: Triacmoserica
- Species: T. stegmanni

Binomial name
- Triacmoserica stegmanni Kolbe, 1914

Species of beetle

Triacmoserica stegmanni is a species of beetle of the family Scarabaeidae. It is found in Tanzania.

== Description ==
Adults reach a length of about 7.5 mm (0.30 in). They have an elongated, reddish-yellowish-brown body, with the elytra yellowish-brown, the antennae yellow, the femora yellowish-brown, the tibiae reddish-brown, and the tarsi dark brown. The clypeus is shiny, with a few punctures posteriorly. The pronotum is abundantly and moderately strongly punctured, the punctures of a similar type, as large as the spaces between the punctures. The scutellum is moderately densely punctured. The elytra are more than half as long as wide, the striae distinct, depressed, punctured. The pygidium is slightly convex, abundantly punctured, and wrinkled-punctate on the posterior half.
