= Pseudotrochalus consanguineus =

Scientific classification
- Kingdom: Animalia
- Phylum: Arthropoda
- Class: Insecta
- Order: Coleoptera
- Suborder: Polyphaga
- Infraorder: Scarabaeiformia
- Family: Scarabaeidae
- Genus: Pseudotrochalus
- Species: P. consanguineus

Binomial name
- Pseudotrochalus consanguineus Moser, 1919

Species of beetle

Pseudotrochalus consanguineus is a species of beetle of the family Scarabaeidae. It is found in Tanzania.

== Description ==
Adults reach a length of about 8 mm. Apart from the colouration, which probably varies, they are very similar to Pseudotrochalus constrictus. They are brownish-green and dull with a faint silky sheen. The frons is quite extensively, and the clypeus densely punctured. The legs are shiny and brown.
