= Schizonycha leupolti =

Scientific classification
- Kingdom: Animalia
- Phylum: Arthropoda
- Clade: Pancrustacea
- Class: Insecta
- Order: Coleoptera
- Suborder: Polyphaga
- Infraorder: Scarabaeiformia
- Family: Scarabaeidae
- Genus: Schizonycha
- Species: S. leupolti

Binomial name
- Schizonycha leupolti Kolbe, 1914

Species of beetle

Schizonycha leupolti is a species of beetle of the family Scarabaeidae. It is found in Tanzania.

== Description ==
Adults reach a length of about 13 mm (0.51 in). They have a moderately long, almost cylindrical, brownish-yellow body, with the head, pronotum and legs reddish-brown. The pronotum and elytra have moderately long white setae, while the thorax and femora have elongated fine hairs. The abdomen has scattered, shorter hairs ventrally, but is not densely covered.
