= Pterolophia variolosa =

Scientific classification
- Kingdom: Animalia
- Phylum: Arthropoda
- Clade: Pancrustacea
- Class: Insecta
- Order: Coleoptera
- Suborder: Polyphaga
- Infraorder: Cucujiformia
- Family: Cerambycidae
- Genus: Pterolophia
- Species: P. variolosa

Binomial name
- Pterolophia variolosa (Kolbe, 1893)

Synonyms
- Praonetha variolosa Kolbe, 1893; Praonetha unifasciata Kolbe, 1893

Species of beetle

Pterolophia variolosa is a species of beetle in the family Cerambycidae. It was described by Hermann Julius Kolbe in 1893, originally under the genus Praonetha.
