= Oberea sanguinalis =

Scientific classification
- Domain: Eukaryota
- Kingdom: Animalia
- Phylum: Arthropoda
- Class: Insecta
- Order: Coleoptera
- Suborder: Polyphaga
- Infraorder: Cucujiformia
- Family: Cerambycidae
- Genus: Oberea
- Species: O. sanguinalis

Binomial name
- Oberea sanguinalis (Kolbe, 1893)

Synonyms
- Nitocris sanguinalis Kolbe, 1893

Species of beetle

Oberea sanguinalis is a species of beetle in the family Cerambycidae. It was described by Hermann Julius Kolbe in 1893. It is known from Cameroon, Benin, and Togo.
