= Pseudotrochalus consimilis =

Scientific classification
- Kingdom: Animalia
- Phylum: Arthropoda
- Clade: Pancrustacea
- Class: Insecta
- Order: Coleoptera
- Suborder: Polyphaga
- Infraorder: Scarabaeiformia
- Family: Scarabaeidae
- Genus: Pseudotrochalus
- Species: P. consimilis

Binomial name
- Pseudotrochalus consimilis Kolbe, 1914

Species of beetle

Pseudotrochalus consimilis is a species of beetle of the family Scarabaeidae. It is found in Tanzania.

== Description ==
Adults reach a length of about 8.5 mm (0.33 in). They are dull dark brown, with the elytra reddish-brown and the underside partly glossy. The pronotum is fringed laterally with individual setae and is not quite twice as wide as long, evenly rounded laterally, and the entire upper surface is rather densely and finely punctate. The elytra are broadest in the middle, moderately deeply striated, with the striations punctate, and the spaces between the striae irregularly punctate.
