= Neoserica fasta =

Scientific classification
- Kingdom: Animalia
- Phylum: Arthropoda
- Class: Insecta
- Order: Coleoptera
- Suborder: Polyphaga
- Infraorder: Scarabaeiformia
- Family: Scarabaeidae
- Genus: Neoserica
- Species: N. fasta

Binomial name
- Neoserica fasta (Brenske, 1901)

Synonyms
- Lepiserica fasta Brenske, 1901; Autoserica fasta

Species of beetle

Neoserica fasta is a species of beetle of the family Scarabaeidae. It is found in Mozambique.

== Description ==
Adults reach a length of about 8 mm. They are reddish-brown, strongly opaline, and resemble Neoserica benigna, but are thicker. The head and prothorax are very similarly formed, but the minute hairs in the punctures there and on the elytra are somewhat more distinct, and the white setae somewhat weaker.
