= Pseudotrochalus schubotzi =

Scientific classification
- Kingdom: Animalia
- Phylum: Arthropoda
- Clade: Pancrustacea
- Class: Insecta
- Order: Coleoptera
- Suborder: Polyphaga
- Infraorder: Scarabaeiformia
- Family: Scarabaeidae
- Genus: Pseudotrochalus
- Species: P. schubotzi

Binomial name
- Pseudotrochalus schubotzi (Kolbe, 1914)

Synonyms
- Autoserica schubotzi Kolbe, 1914

Species of beetle

Pseudotrochalus schubotzi is a species of beetle of the family Scarabaeidae. It is found in the Democratic Republic of the Congo and Rwanda.

== Description ==
Adults reach a length of about 11–11.5 mm (0.43–0.45 in). They have an egg-shaped, dark brown, moderately glossy, sparsely punctate body. The underside is smooth and shinier. The pronotum is quite broad, sparsely punctate, the lateral margins without setae. The anterior margin is slightly projecting in the middle, weakly rounded at the sides, and the posterior angles are bluntly rounded. The scutellum is densely punctate in the middle, smooth at the sides and posteriorly. The elytra have depressed striae. The pygidium is shiny and sparsely punctate.
