= Philomecyna =

Scientific classification
- Kingdom: Animalia
- Phylum: Arthropoda
- Clade: Pancrustacea
- Class: Insecta
- Order: Coleoptera
- Suborder: Polyphaga
- Infraorder: Cucujiformia
- Family: Cerambycidae
- Subfamily: Lamiinae
- Tribe: Apomecynini
- Genus: Philomecyna; Kolbe, 1893

Synonyms
- Parischnia Aurivillius, 1907

Genus of beetles

Philomecyna is a genus of beetles in the family Cerambycidae. It occurs in Sub-Saharan Africa.

== Species ==
There are ten accepted species:

- Philomecyna allardi Breuning, 1966
- Philomecyna camerunica (Aurivillius, 1907)
- Philomecyna fuscicollis Breuning, 1965
- Philomecyna kivuensis Breuning, 1954
- Philomecyna leleupi Breuning, 1975
- Philomecyna persimilis Breuning, 1978
- Philomecyna pilosella Kolbe, 1893
- Philomecyna rufoantennalis Breuning, 1978
- Philomecyna spinosa (Aurivillius, 1907)
- Philomecyna tanganjicae Breuning, 1964
