= Pseudotrochalus splendens =

Scientific classification
- Kingdom: Animalia
- Phylum: Arthropoda
- Clade: Pancrustacea
- Class: Insecta
- Order: Coleoptera
- Suborder: Polyphaga
- Infraorder: Scarabaeiformia
- Family: Scarabaeidae
- Genus: Pseudotrochalus
- Species: P. splendens

Binomial name
- Pseudotrochalus splendens Moser, 1917

Species of beetle

Pseudotrochalus splendens is a species of beetle of the family Scarabaeidae. It is found in Cameroon and the Republic of the Congo.

== Description ==
Adults reach a length of about 7 mm. They are black and highly shiny. The underside is usually brown. The frons is moderately densely covered with rather fine punctures and the antennae are yellowish-brown. The pronotum is densely and finely punctured and the elytra have rows of punctures, with the intervals rather widely covered with fine punctures.
