= Pseudotrochalus neavei =

Scientific classification
- Kingdom: Animalia
- Phylum: Arthropoda
- Clade: Pancrustacea
- Class: Insecta
- Order: Coleoptera
- Suborder: Polyphaga
- Infraorder: Scarabaeiformia
- Family: Scarabaeidae
- Genus: Pseudotrochalus
- Species: P. neavei

Binomial name
- Pseudotrochalus neavei Moser, 1916

Species of beetle

Pseudotrochalus neavei is a species of beetle of the family Scarabaeidae. It is found in the Democratic Republic of the Congo.

== Description ==
Adults reach a length of about seven mm. They are black, the head and pronotum with a faint green or coppery sheen. The head is densely punctate and the antennae are yellowish-brown. The pronotum is fairly densely punctate and the elytra have rows of punctures.
