= Pseudhammus rothschildi =

Scientific classification
- Kingdom: Animalia
- Phylum: Arthropoda
- Class: Insecta
- Order: Coleoptera
- Suborder: Polyphaga
- Infraorder: Cucujiformia
- Family: Cerambycidae
- Genus: Pseudhammus
- Species: P. rothschildi

Binomial name
- Pseudhammus rothschildi Gahan, 1909

Species of beetle

Pseudhammus rothschildi is a species of beetle in the family Cerambycidae. It was described by Charles Joseph Gahan in 1909.
