= Neonitocris mangenoti =

Scientific classification
- Kingdom: Animalia
- Phylum: Arthropoda
- Class: Insecta
- Order: Coleoptera
- Suborder: Polyphaga
- Infraorder: Cucujiformia
- Family: Cerambycidae
- Genus: Neonitocris
- Species: N. mangenoti

Binomial name
- Neonitocris mangenoti Lepesme & Breuning, 1953

Species of beetle

Neonitocris mangenoti is a species of beetle in the family Cerambycidae. It was described by Lepesme and Stephan von Breuning in 1953.
