= Lepitrichula lanata =

Scientific classification
- Kingdom: Animalia
- Phylum: Arthropoda
- Class: Insecta
- Order: Coleoptera
- Suborder: Polyphaga
- Infraorder: Scarabaeiformia
- Family: Scarabaeidae
- Genus: Lepitrichula
- Species: L. lanata

Binomial name
- Lepitrichula lanata (Boheman, 1857)

Synonyms
- Anisonyx lanatus Boheman, 1857

Species of beetle

Lepitrichula lanata is a species of beetle of the family Scarabaeidae. It is found in South Africa (KwaZulu-Natal) and Zimbabwe.

== Description ==
Adults reach a length of about 4.5–5 mm (0.18–0.20 in). They are black with light brown elytra without a dark margin. The whole body is covered with long, erect white hairs, interspersed with some black setae. The underside and legs are covered with long, white hairs.
