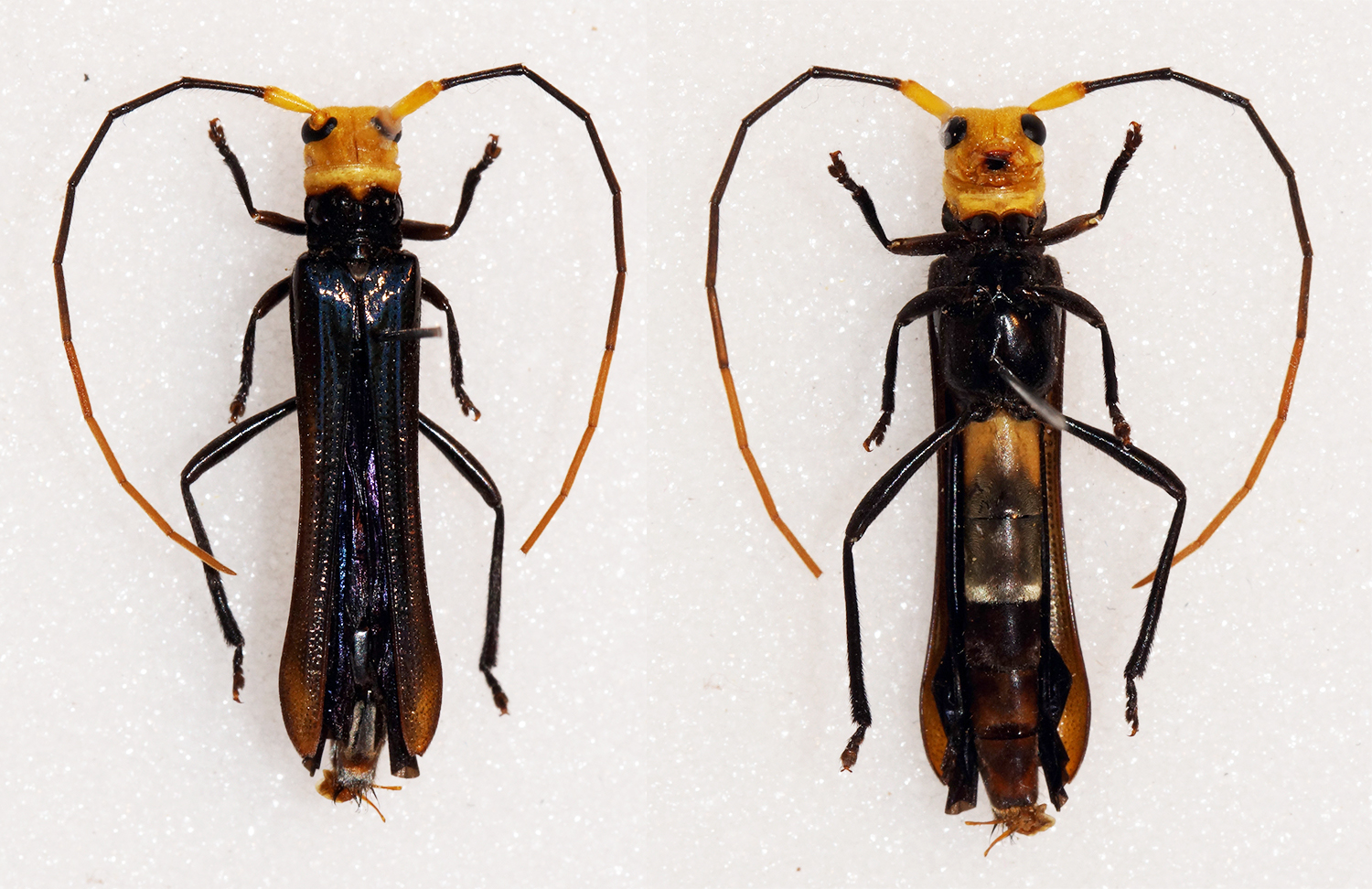
- Neonitocris princeps

Scientific classification
- Kingdom: Animalia
- Phylum: Arthropoda
- Class: Insecta
- Order: Coleoptera
- Suborder: Polyphaga
- Infraorder: Cucujiformia
- Family: Cerambycidae
- Subfamily: Lamiinae
- Tribe: Saperdini
- Genus: Neonitocris; Breuning, 1950

= Neonitocris =

Genus of beetles

Neonitocris is a genus of longhorn beetles of the subfamily Lamiinae, containing the following species:

- Neonitocris alzanoi Breuning, 1950
- Neonitocris atra (Jordan, 1894)
- Neonitocris bourgeati Breuning & Téocchi, 1978
- Neonitocris calva (Thomson, 1868)
- Neonitocris ealensis Breuning, 1950
- Neonitocris emarginata (Chevrolat, 1858)
- Neonitocris eulitopoides Lepesme, 1947
- Neonitocris flavipes Breuning, 1950
- Neonitocris gaboniensis Breuning, 1956
- Neonitocris hiekei Breuning, 1965
- Neonitocris infrarufa Breuning, 1956
- Neonitocris leonis (Jordan, 1894)
- Neonitocris mangenoti Lepesme & Breuning, 1953
- Neonitocris modesta (Fabricius, 1781)
- Neonitocris nigriceps Breuning, 1957
- Neonitocris nigripes (Kolbe, 1893)
- Neonitocris orientalis Breuning, 1956
- Neonitocris plicata (Hintz, 1919)
- Neonitocris postscutellaris Lepesme & Breuning, 1951
- Neonitocris princeps (Jordan, 1894)
- Neonitocris regina (Jordan, 1894)
- Neonitocris rubricollis Téocchi & Sudre, 2003
- Neonitocris rubriventris (Hintz, 1919)
- Neonitocris rufipes Breuning, 1950
- Neonitocris servilis (Jordan, 1894)
- Neonitocris sibutensis Breuning, 1956
- Neonitocris spiniscapus Breuning, 1956
- Neonitocris thoracica (Jordan, 1894)
