= Neonitocris eulitopoides =

Scientific classification
- Kingdom: Animalia
- Phylum: Arthropoda
- Class: Insecta
- Order: Coleoptera
- Suborder: Polyphaga
- Infraorder: Cucujiformia
- Family: Cerambycidae
- Genus: Neonitocris
- Species: N. eulitopoides

Binomial name
- Neonitocris eulitopoides Lepesme, 1947

Species of beetle

Neonitocris eulitopoides is a species of beetle in the Cerambycidae family. It was described by Lepesme in 1947.
