= Pseudotrochalus rugosiceps =

Scientific classification
- Kingdom: Animalia
- Phylum: Arthropoda
- Class: Insecta
- Order: Coleoptera
- Suborder: Polyphaga
- Infraorder: Scarabaeiformia
- Family: Scarabaeidae
- Genus: Pseudotrochalus
- Species: P. rugosiceps

Binomial name
- Pseudotrochalus rugosiceps Frey, 1974

Species of beetle

Pseudotrochalus rugosiceps is a species of beetle of the family Scarabaeidae. It is found in Ghana.

== Description ==
Adults reach a length of about 7 mm. The upper and lower surfaces are blackish-brown and shiny, with the underside and legs somewhat lighter. The antennae are yellow. The back of the head and pronotum are very densely and finely punctate. The elytra have striae of punctures.
