= Pseudotrochalus durbanus =

Scientific classification
- Kingdom: Animalia
- Phylum: Arthropoda
- Clade: Pancrustacea
- Class: Insecta
- Order: Coleoptera
- Suborder: Polyphaga
- Infraorder: Scarabaeiformia
- Family: Scarabaeidae
- Genus: Pseudotrochalus
- Species: P. durbanus

Binomial name
- Pseudotrochalus durbanus Moser, 1917

Species of beetle

Pseudotrochalus durbanus is a species of beetle of the family Scarabaeidae. It is found in South Africa (KwaZulu-Natal).

== Description ==
Adults reach a length of about 7 mm. They are black, dull and slightly iridescent. The frons is rather narrowly punctate, and the antennae are yellowish-brown. The pronotum is densely and finely punctate and the elytra have regular rows of punctures, with the intervals sparsely punctate.
