= Pseudotrochalus pygmaeus =

Scientific classification
- Kingdom: Animalia
- Phylum: Arthropoda
- Class: Insecta
- Order: Coleoptera
- Suborder: Polyphaga
- Infraorder: Scarabaeiformia
- Family: Scarabaeidae
- Genus: Pseudotrochalus
- Species: P. pygmaeus

Binomial name
- Pseudotrochalus pygmaeus Frey, 1968

Species of beetle

Pseudotrochalus pygmaeus is a species of beetle of the family Scarabaeidae. It is found in Guinea.

== Description ==
Adults reach a length of about 4.5 mm. The upper and lower surfaces are light reddish-brown and shiny, with the pronotum slightly lighter than the elytra. The pronotum, elytra, and scutellum are finely punctate.
