= Pseudhammus alboplagiatus =

Scientific classification
- Kingdom: Animalia
- Phylum: Arthropoda
- Class: Insecta
- Order: Coleoptera
- Suborder: Polyphaga
- Infraorder: Cucujiformia
- Family: Cerambycidae
- Genus: Pseudhammus
- Species: P. alboplagiatus

Binomial name
- Pseudhammus alboplagiatus Breuning, 1935

Species of beetle

Pseudhammus alboplagiatus is a species of beetle in the family Cerambycidae. It was described by Stephan von Breuning in 1935.
