= Pseudotrochalus fraterculus =

Scientific classification
- Kingdom: Animalia
- Phylum: Arthropoda
- Clade: Pancrustacea
- Class: Insecta
- Order: Coleoptera
- Suborder: Polyphaga
- Infraorder: Scarabaeiformia
- Family: Scarabaeidae
- Genus: Pseudotrochalus
- Species: P. fraterculus

Binomial name
- Pseudotrochalus fraterculus Moser, 1916

Species of beetle

Pseudotrochalus fraterculus is a species of beetle of the family Scarabaeidae. It is found in the Democratic Republic of the Congo.

== Description ==
Adults reach a length of about 7–8 mm. They are blackish-green and dull above, while the elytra are blackish-brown. The frons is quite densely covered with punctures and the antennae are brown. The punctation of the pronotum is quite dense, the punctures mostly with minute setae. The elytra have rows of punctures, the spaces between them scattered with tiny bristly punctures.
