= Triacmoserica tetraphylla =

Scientific classification
- Kingdom: Animalia
- Phylum: Arthropoda
- Clade: Pancrustacea
- Class: Insecta
- Order: Coleoptera
- Suborder: Polyphaga
- Infraorder: Scarabaeiformia
- Family: Scarabaeidae
- Genus: Triacmoserica
- Species: T. tetraphylla

Binomial name
- Triacmoserica tetraphylla Moser, 1918

Species of beetle

Triacmoserica tetraphylla is a species of beetle of the family Scarabaeidae. It is found in Tanzania.

== Description ==
Adults reach a length of about 6.5 mm. They are yellow, with the head, pronotum and scutellum reddish. The head is punctate and the antennae are yellow. The pronotum is densely punctate and the elytra have rows of punctures, with the intervals quite densely covered with punctures.
