= Neonitocris emarginata =

Scientific classification
- Domain: Eukaryota
- Kingdom: Animalia
- Phylum: Arthropoda
- Class: Insecta
- Order: Coleoptera
- Suborder: Polyphaga
- Infraorder: Cucujiformia
- Family: Cerambycidae
- Genus: Neonitocris
- Species: N. emarginata

Binomial name
- Neonitocris emarginata (Chevrolat, 1858)

Synonyms
- Nitocris emarginata Chevrolat, 1858

Species of beetle

Neonitocris emarginata is a species of beetle in the family Cerambycidae. It was described by Chevrolat in 1858.
