= Pseudotrochalus parvulus =

Scientific classification
- Kingdom: Animalia
- Phylum: Arthropoda
- Class: Insecta
- Order: Coleoptera
- Suborder: Polyphaga
- Infraorder: Scarabaeiformia
- Family: Scarabaeidae
- Genus: Pseudotrochalus
- Species: P. parvulus

Binomial name
- Pseudotrochalus parvulus Frey, 1970

Species of beetle

Pseudotrochalus parvulus is a species of beetle of the family Scarabaeidae. It is found in Ivory Coast.

== Description ==
Adults reach a length of about 5 mm. The upper surface is blackish-brown, weakly shiny and somewhat opalescent, while the underside is dark reddish-brown. The antennae are yellow. The pronotum is very finely punctate and the elytra have fine striae (without visible punctures), while the intervals are extremely finely and sparsely punctate.
