= Neonitocris regina =

Scientific classification
- Domain: Eukaryota
- Kingdom: Animalia
- Phylum: Arthropoda
- Class: Insecta
- Order: Coleoptera
- Suborder: Polyphaga
- Infraorder: Cucujiformia
- Family: Cerambycidae
- Genus: Neonitocris
- Species: N. regina

Binomial name
- Neonitocris regina (Jordan, 1894)

Species of beetle

Neonitocris regina is a species of beetle in the family Cerambycidae. It was described by Karl Jordan in 1894.
