= Pseudotrochalus longithorax =

Scientific classification
- Kingdom: Animalia
- Phylum: Arthropoda
- Clade: Pancrustacea
- Class: Insecta
- Order: Coleoptera
- Suborder: Polyphaga
- Infraorder: Scarabaeiformia
- Family: Scarabaeidae
- Genus: Pseudotrochalus
- Species: P. longithorax

Binomial name
- Pseudotrochalus longithorax Brenske, 1903

Species of beetle

Pseudotrochalus longithorax is a species of beetle of the family Scarabaeidae. It is found in the Republic of the Congo.

== Description ==
Adults reach a length of about 8 mm (0.31 in). They have an oval, dull, dark body. The clypeus is short, with a more distinct margin at the front than at the sides. A row of coarse setiferous punctures lies amidst the densely rugose punctation, situated almost in the center of the surface. The frons and the elongated pronotum are densely and distinctly punctate. The elytra have simple rows of punctures.
