= Pseudotrochalus ertli =

Scientific classification
- Kingdom: Animalia
- Phylum: Arthropoda
- Clade: Pancrustacea
- Class: Insecta
- Order: Coleoptera
- Suborder: Polyphaga
- Infraorder: Scarabaeiformia
- Family: Scarabaeidae
- Genus: Pseudotrochalus
- Species: P. ertli

Binomial name
- Pseudotrochalus ertli Moser, 1919

Species of beetle

Pseudotrochalus ertli is a species of beetle of the family Scarabaeidae. It is found in Zambia.

== Description ==
Adults reach a length of about 10.5 mm. They are very similar to Pseudotrochalus praecellens, with the same shape and colouration. The clypeus is somewhat more strongly tapered anteriorly, the pronotum is more finely and widely punctate, and the posterior angles of the pronotum are more broadly rounded. In the rows of punctures on the elytra, the punctures are more widely spaced than in praecellens, the intervals between the rows are even shallower, and the punctures are weaker. The punctation of the pygidium is also somewhat finer.
