= Neonitocris rubriventris =

Scientific classification
- Domain: Eukaryota
- Kingdom: Animalia
- Phylum: Arthropoda
- Class: Insecta
- Order: Coleoptera
- Suborder: Polyphaga
- Infraorder: Cucujiformia
- Family: Cerambycidae
- Genus: Neonitocris
- Species: N. rubriventris

Binomial name
- Neonitocris rubriventris (Hintz, 1919)

Synonyms
- Nitocris rubriventris Hintz, 1919

Species of beetle

Neonitocris rubriventris is a species of beetle in the family Cerambycidae. It was described by Hintz in 1919.
