= Pseudotrochalus nigrofuscus =

Scientific classification
- Kingdom: Animalia
- Phylum: Arthropoda
- Clade: Pancrustacea
- Class: Insecta
- Order: Coleoptera
- Suborder: Polyphaga
- Infraorder: Scarabaeiformia
- Family: Scarabaeidae
- Genus: Pseudotrochalus
- Species: P. nigrofuscus

Binomial name
- Pseudotrochalus nigrofuscus Moser, 1924

Species of beetle

Pseudotrochalus nigrofuscus is a species of beetle of the family Scarabaeidae. It is found in Tanzania.

== Description ==
Adults reach a length of about 6 mm. They are blackish-brown and opaque. The antennae are tawny.
