= Pseudotrochalus sexflabellatus =

Scientific classification
- Kingdom: Animalia
- Phylum: Arthropoda
- Class: Insecta
- Order: Coleoptera
- Suborder: Polyphaga
- Infraorder: Scarabaeiformia
- Family: Scarabaeidae
- Genus: Pseudotrochalus
- Species: P. sexflabellatus

Binomial name
- Pseudotrochalus sexflabellatus Frey, 1968

Species of beetle

Pseudotrochalus sexflabellatus is a species of beetle of the family Scarabaeidae. It is found in Cameroon.

== Description ==
Adults reach a length of about 7–8 mm. The upper and lower surfaces are dark brown, slightly shiny, with a silky sheen. The antennae are light brown. The frons is simply and fairly densely punctate and the vertex is very finely and densely punctate with a bare patch on the anterior margin.
