= Pseudhammus similis =

Scientific classification
- Kingdom: Animalia
- Phylum: Arthropoda
- Class: Insecta
- Order: Coleoptera
- Suborder: Polyphaga
- Infraorder: Cucujiformia
- Family: Cerambycidae
- Genus: Pseudhammus
- Species: P. similis

Binomial name
- Pseudhammus similis (Dillon & Dillon, 1959)

Species of beetle

Pseudhammus similis is a species of beetle in the family Cerambycidae. It was described by Dillon and Dillon in 1959.
