= Pseudhammus rhamnus =

Scientific classification
- Kingdom: Animalia
- Phylum: Arthropoda
- Class: Insecta
- Order: Coleoptera
- Suborder: Polyphaga
- Infraorder: Cucujiformia
- Family: Cerambycidae
- Genus: Pseudhammus
- Species: P. rhamnus

Binomial name
- Pseudhammus rhamnus Dillon & Dillon, 1959

Species of beetle

Pseudhammus rhamnus is a species of beetle in the family Cerambycidae. It was described by Dillon and Dillon in 1959.
