= Stenoserica zambesicola =

Scientific classification
- Kingdom: Animalia
- Phylum: Arthropoda
- Class: Insecta
- Order: Coleoptera
- Suborder: Polyphaga
- Infraorder: Scarabaeiformia
- Family: Scarabaeidae
- Genus: Stenoserica
- Species: S. zambesicola

Binomial name
- Stenoserica zambesicola Péringuey, 1904

Species of beetle

Stenoserica zambesicola is a species of beetle of the family Scarabaeidae. It is found in Zambia and Zimbabwe.

== Description ==
Adults reach a length of about 7 mm. They are chestnut-brown, with the frontal part of the head and the prothorax fuscous and glabrous. The elytra are opaque with a slight opaline sheen. The club of the antennae is flavescent.
