= Pseudhammus congolensis =

Scientific classification
- Kingdom: Animalia
- Phylum: Arthropoda
- Class: Insecta
- Order: Coleoptera
- Suborder: Polyphaga
- Infraorder: Cucujiformia
- Family: Cerambycidae
- Genus: Pseudhammus
- Species: P. congolensis

Binomial name
- Pseudhammus congolensis (Hintz, 1913)

Synonyms
- Monohammus congolensis Hintz, 1913

Species of beetle

Pseudhammus congolensis is a species of beetle in the family Cerambycidae. It was described by Hintz in 1913, originally under the genus Monohammus.
