= Pseudotrochalus propinquus =

Scientific classification
- Kingdom: Animalia
- Phylum: Arthropoda
- Clade: Pancrustacea
- Class: Insecta
- Order: Coleoptera
- Suborder: Polyphaga
- Infraorder: Scarabaeiformia
- Family: Scarabaeidae
- Genus: Pseudotrochalus
- Species: P. propinquus

Binomial name
- Pseudotrochalus propinquus Moser, 1916

Species of beetle

Pseudotrochalus propinquus is a species of beetle of the family Scarabaeidae. It is found in the Democratic Republic of the Congo.

== Description ==
Adults reach a length of about 7–8 mm. The upper surface is dull, with a faint silky sheen. The head and pronotum are blackish-green or greenish-brown, while the elytra are reddish-brown or black. The underside is brown or blackish-brown with a greenish sheen. The antennae are reddish-yellow. The pronotum has fairly dense punctation and have setae on the lateral margins. The elytra have rows of punctures, with the intervals sparsely covered with tiny bristle-bearing punctures.
