= Pseudotrochalus puncticollis =

Scientific classification
- Kingdom: Animalia
- Phylum: Arthropoda
- Clade: Pancrustacea
- Class: Insecta
- Order: Coleoptera
- Suborder: Polyphaga
- Infraorder: Scarabaeiformia
- Family: Scarabaeidae
- Genus: Pseudotrochalus
- Species: P. puncticollis

Binomial name
- Pseudotrochalus puncticollis Moser, 1918

Species of beetle

Pseudotrochalus puncticollis is a species of beetle of the family Scarabaeidae. It is found in Togo.

== Description ==
Adults reach a length of about 8 mm. They are shiny, black or blackish-brown above and reddish-brown below. The head is quite densely punctured and the antennae are yellowish-brown. The pronotum is densely and quite strongly punctured and the elytra has rows of punctures, with the intervals moderately densely punctured.
