= Philomecyna kivuensis =

Scientific classification
- Kingdom: Animalia
- Phylum: Arthropoda
- Class: Insecta
- Order: Coleoptera
- Suborder: Polyphaga
- Infraorder: Cucujiformia
- Family: Cerambycidae
- Genus: Philomecyna
- Species: P. kivuensis

Binomial name
- Philomecyna kivuensis Breuning, 1954

Species of beetle

Philomecyna kivuensis is a species of beetle in the family Cerambycidae. It was described by Breuning in 1954.
