= Pseudotrochalus constrictus =

Scientific classification
- Kingdom: Animalia
- Phylum: Arthropoda
- Class: Insecta
- Order: Coleoptera
- Suborder: Polyphaga
- Infraorder: Scarabaeiformia
- Family: Scarabaeidae
- Genus: Pseudotrochalus
- Species: P. constrictus

Binomial name
- Pseudotrochalus constrictus Moser, 1919

Species of beetle

Pseudotrochalus constrictus is a species of beetle of the family Scarabaeidae. It is found in Tanzania.

== Description ==
Adults reach a length of about 8 mm. They are very similar to Pseudotrochalus benguellanus, but may be distinguished by the more strongly broadened hind legs. They are reddish-brown and dull, with the legs shiny and the pronotum, scutellum, and thorax more or less greenish. The frons is moderately densely punctate and the clypeus is densely punctate. The latter is laterally constricted behind the anterior angles. The pronotum is similarly shaped to that of benguellanus and densely and finely punctate dorsally. The elytra have striae of punctures, with the intervals almost flat.
