= Pseudotrochalus niger =

Scientific classification
- Kingdom: Animalia
- Phylum: Arthropoda
- Clade: Pancrustacea
- Class: Insecta
- Order: Coleoptera
- Suborder: Polyphaga
- Infraorder: Scarabaeiformia
- Family: Scarabaeidae
- Genus: Pseudotrochalus
- Species: P. niger

Binomial name
- Pseudotrochalus niger Brenske, 1903

Species of beetle

Pseudotrochalus niger is a species of beetle of the family Scarabaeidae. It is found in the Republic of the Congo and the Democratic Republic of the Congo.

== Description ==
Adults reach a length of about 9 mm (0.35 in). They have an oval, glossy, black, robust body. The clypeus is broad, moderately projecting, and has a faint, uniform margin. Its surface is strongly but less densely punctate, not rugose, and features a slight longitudinal elevation in the center. The pronotum is densely and more coarsely punctate. The scutellum is pointed and densely punctate and the elytra have fine rows of punctures bordered by parallel, smooth striae. The intervals are distinctly punctate. The pygidium is more sparsely punctate and sometimes smooth at the apex.
