= Stenoserica interpunctata =

Scientific classification
- Kingdom: Animalia
- Phylum: Arthropoda
- Class: Insecta
- Order: Coleoptera
- Suborder: Polyphaga
- Infraorder: Scarabaeiformia
- Family: Scarabaeidae
- Genus: Stenoserica
- Species: S. interpunctata

Binomial name
- Stenoserica interpunctata (Boheman, 1860)

Synonyms
- Serica interpunctata Boheman, 1860

Species of beetle

Stenoserica interpunctata is a species of beetle of the family Scarabaeidae. It is found in Botswana.

== Description ==
Adults reach a length of about 7–8 mm. They are reddish-yellow with a dark head and pronotum. The intervals of the elytra have broad striations.
