= Pseudotrochalus lamtoensis =

Scientific classification
- Kingdom: Animalia
- Phylum: Arthropoda
- Class: Insecta
- Order: Coleoptera
- Suborder: Polyphaga
- Infraorder: Scarabaeiformia
- Family: Scarabaeidae
- Genus: Pseudotrochalus
- Species: P. lamtoensis

Binomial name
- Pseudotrochalus lamtoensis Frey, 1970

Species of beetle

Pseudotrochalus lamtoensis is a species of beetle of the family Scarabaeidae. It is found in Ivory Coast.

== Description ==
Adults reach a length of about 8 mm. The upper and lower surfaces are glabrous, light reddish-brown and dull. The border of the scutellum, the sutural stripe and another stripe on the margin of the elytra are all black. There are some indistinct, black spots on the pronotum. The underside is shiny and blackish-brown. The pronotum is tomentose and the punctures are barely visible. The elytra, like the pronotum, are tomentose with fine, fairly uniform rows of punctures.
