= Philomecyna rufoantennalis =

Scientific classification
- Kingdom: Animalia
- Phylum: Arthropoda
- Class: Insecta
- Order: Coleoptera
- Suborder: Polyphaga
- Infraorder: Cucujiformia
- Family: Cerambycidae
- Genus: Philomecyna
- Species: P. rufoantennalis

Binomial name
- Philomecyna rufoantennalis Breuning, 1978

Species of beetle

Philomecyna rufoantennalis is a species of beetle in the family Cerambycidae. It was described by Breuning in 1978.
