= Pseudotrochalus excisiceps =

Scientific classification
- Kingdom: Animalia
- Phylum: Arthropoda
- Class: Insecta
- Order: Coleoptera
- Suborder: Polyphaga
- Infraorder: Scarabaeiformia
- Family: Scarabaeidae
- Genus: Pseudotrochalus
- Species: P. excisiceps

Binomial name
- Pseudotrochalus excisiceps Frey, 1974

Species of beetle

Pseudotrochalus excisiceps is a species of beetle of the family Scarabaeidae. It is found in South Africa (KwaZulu-Natal).

== Description ==
Adults reach a length of about 4–5 mm. The upper and lower surfaces are dark reddish-brown, iridescent and glabrous, with the margins of the wings fringed. The antennae are dark brown. The pronotum is very densely and finely evenly punctate, while the elytra have punctate striae, with the intervals somewhat coarser and less densely punctate than the pronotum.
