= Stenoserica freudei =

Scientific classification
- Kingdom: Animalia
- Phylum: Arthropoda
- Class: Insecta
- Order: Coleoptera
- Suborder: Polyphaga
- Infraorder: Scarabaeiformia
- Family: Scarabaeidae
- Genus: Stenoserica
- Species: S. freudei

Binomial name
- Stenoserica freudei Frey, 1970

Species of beetle

Stenoserica freudei is a species of beetle of the family Scarabaeidae. It is found in Namibia.

== Description ==
Adults reach a length of about 7 mm. The upper and lower surfaces are straw-yellow, with the head somewhat darker. The upper surface is silky-glossy, while the underside is without a silky sheen. The antennae are yellow. The upper surface is glabrous. There are sparse setae on the ventral segments, thorax, and legs. The pronotum is finely and somewhat unevenly sparsely punctate and the elytra have fine striae of punctures. The lateral margins of both the elytra and the pronotum are fringed with pale yellow hairs.
