= Pseudotrochalus sjostedti =

Scientific classification
- Kingdom: Animalia
- Phylum: Arthropoda
- Clade: Pancrustacea
- Class: Insecta
- Order: Coleoptera
- Suborder: Polyphaga
- Infraorder: Scarabaeiformia
- Family: Scarabaeidae
- Genus: Pseudotrochalus
- Species: P. sjostedti

Binomial name
- Pseudotrochalus sjostedti Brenske, 1903

Species of beetle

Pseudotrochalus sjostedti is a species of beetle of the family Scarabaeidae. It is found in Cameroon.

== Description ==
Adults reach a length of about 11 mm (0.43 in). They have an egg-shaped body. The underside is brown, while the upper surface is opalescent, with a dark head and dark margins on the elytra. The clypeus tapers strongly towards the front, is distinctly bordered, and straight-edged anteriorly with setiferous punctures behind the front margin. Its surface is densely rugose-punctate. The frons is finely and dully punctate. The pronotum has slightly rounded posterior angles and strongly projecting anterior angles. The front margin is very slightly produced in the middle, whereas the hind margin is distinctly so, with impressions on either side of the scutellum. The surface is finely, densely, and distinctly punctate, with a faintly raised longitudinal streak in the center. The scutellum is long. The elytra bear distinct rows of punctures that are impressed but do not form smooth, parallel lines. The intervals are finely punctate.
