= Pseudhammus vittatus =

Scientific classification
- Kingdom: Animalia
- Phylum: Arthropoda
- Class: Insecta
- Order: Coleoptera
- Suborder: Polyphaga
- Infraorder: Cucujiformia
- Family: Cerambycidae
- Genus: Pseudhammus
- Species: P. vittatus

Binomial name
- Pseudhammus vittatus Aurivillius, 1927

Species of beetle

Pseudhammus vittatus is a species of beetle in the family Cerambycidae. It was described by Per Olof Christopher Aurivillius in 1927.

== Subspecies ==
- Pseudhammus vittatus frontalis Dillon & Dillon, 1959
- Pseudhammus vittatus vittatus Aurivillius, 1927
