= Philomecyna pilosella =

Scientific classification
- Kingdom: Animalia
- Phylum: Arthropoda
- Class: Insecta
- Order: Coleoptera
- Suborder: Polyphaga
- Infraorder: Cucujiformia
- Family: Cerambycidae
- Genus: Philomecyna
- Species: P. pilosella

Binomial name
- Philomecyna pilosella Kolbe, 1894

Species of beetle

Philomecyna pilosella is a species of beetle in the family Cerambycidae. It was described by Kolbe in 1894.
