= Philomecyna camerunica =

Scientific classification
- Kingdom: Animalia
- Phylum: Arthropoda
- Class: Insecta
- Order: Coleoptera
- Suborder: Polyphaga
- Infraorder: Cucujiformia
- Family: Cerambycidae
- Genus: Philomecyna
- Species: P. camerunica

Binomial name
- Philomecyna camerunica (Aurivillius, 1907)

Species of beetle

Philomecyna camerunica is a species of beetle in the family Cerambycidae. It was described by Per Olof Christopher Aurivillius in 1907.
