= Pseudhammus oculifrons =

Scientific classification
- Kingdom: Animalia
- Phylum: Arthropoda
- Class: Insecta
- Order: Coleoptera
- Suborder: Polyphaga
- Infraorder: Cucujiformia
- Family: Cerambycidae
- Genus: Pseudhammus
- Species: P. oculifrons

Binomial name
- Pseudhammus oculifrons (Chevrolat, 1856)

Synonyms
- Leprodera oculifrons (Chevrolat) Duvivier, 1892; Litigiosus oculifrons (Chevrolat) Dillon & Dillon, 1959; Monohammus oculifrons Chevrolat, 1856

Species of beetle

Pseudhammus oculifrons is a species of beetle in the family Cerambycidae. It was described by Louis Alexandre Auguste Chevrolat in 1856, originally under the genus Monohammus.
