= Neonitocris modesta =

Scientific classification
- Kingdom: Animalia
- Phylum: Arthropoda
- Clade: Pancrustacea
- Class: Insecta
- Order: Coleoptera
- Suborder: Polyphaga
- Infraorder: Cucujiformia
- Family: Cerambycidae
- Genus: Neonitocris
- Species: N. modesta

Binomial name
- Neonitocris modesta (Fabricius, 1781)

Species of beetle

Neonitocris modesta is a species of beetle in the family Cerambycidae. It was described by Johan Christian Fabricius in 1781. It is known from Guinea.
