= Pseudotrochalus sericinus =

Scientific classification
- Kingdom: Animalia
- Phylum: Arthropoda
- Clade: Pancrustacea
- Class: Insecta
- Order: Coleoptera
- Suborder: Polyphaga
- Infraorder: Scarabaeiformia
- Family: Scarabaeidae
- Genus: Pseudotrochalus
- Species: P. sericinus

Binomial name
- Pseudotrochalus sericinus Moser, 1919

Species of beetle

Pseudotrochalus sericinus is a species of beetle of the family Scarabaeidae. It is found in Mozambique.

== Description ==
Adults reach a length of about 8 mm. They are very similar to Pseudotrochalus bomuanus. They are black and silky shimmering above, and blackish-brown and shiny below. The frons is quite densely punctate and the clypeus densely punctate. The pronotum is not as wide posteriorly as in bomuanus and its surface is quite densely and finely punctate. The elytra have rows of punctures, and the widely punctate intervals are almost flat.
