= Pseudotrochalus kolleri =

Scientific classification
- Kingdom: Animalia
- Phylum: Arthropoda
- Clade: Pancrustacea
- Class: Insecta
- Order: Coleoptera
- Suborder: Polyphaga
- Infraorder: Scarabaeiformia
- Family: Scarabaeidae
- Genus: Pseudotrochalus
- Species: P. kolleri

Binomial name
- Pseudotrochalus kolleri Moser, 1916

Species of beetle

Pseudotrochalus kolleri is a species of beetle of the family Scarabaeidae. It is found in the Democratic Republic of the Congo.

== Description ==
Adults reach a length of about 8.5 mm. They are black and dull, with the legs blackish-brown and shiny. The punctation of the frons is quite widely spaced and the antennae are yellowish-brown. The pronotum is moderately densely covered with fine punctures and the elytra have rows of punctures. The intervals are shallow and sparsely punctured.
