= Neonitocris rubricollis =

Scientific classification
- Domain: Eukaryota
- Kingdom: Animalia
- Phylum: Arthropoda
- Class: Insecta
- Order: Coleoptera
- Suborder: Polyphaga
- Infraorder: Cucujiformia
- Family: Cerambycidae
- Genus: Neonitocris
- Species: N. rubricollis

Binomial name
- Neonitocris rubricollis Téocchi & Sudre, 2003

Species of beetle

Neonitocris rubricollis is a species of beetle in the family Cerambycidae. It was described by Pierre Téocchi and Jérôme Sudre in 2003.
