= Pseudotrochalus congoensis =

Scientific classification
- Kingdom: Animalia
- Phylum: Arthropoda
- Clade: Pancrustacea
- Class: Insecta
- Order: Coleoptera
- Suborder: Polyphaga
- Infraorder: Scarabaeiformia
- Family: Scarabaeidae
- Genus: Pseudotrochalus
- Species: P. congoensis

Binomial name
- Pseudotrochalus congoensis Moser, 1924

Species of beetle

Pseudotrochalus congoensis is a species of beetle of the family Scarabaeidae. It is found in the Democratic Republic of the Congo.

== Description ==
Adults reach a length of about 5.5 mm (0.22 in). They are small, reddish-brown and shiny. The head is quite densely punctate, with reddish-yellow antennae.
