= Pseudotrochalus lujai =

Scientific classification
- Kingdom: Animalia
- Phylum: Arthropoda
- Clade: Pancrustacea
- Class: Insecta
- Order: Coleoptera
- Suborder: Polyphaga
- Infraorder: Scarabaeiformia
- Family: Scarabaeidae
- Genus: Pseudotrochalus
- Species: P. lujai

Binomial name
- Pseudotrochalus lujai Moser, 1916

Species of beetle

Pseudotrochalus lujai is a species of beetle of the family Scarabaeidae. It is found in the Democratic Republic of the Congo.

== Description ==
Adults reach a length of about 9–10 mm. The upper surface is dull and black, with a very faint olive tint. The underside is blackish-brown. The frons is sparsely punctate and dull (except for the narrow anterior margin) and the antennae are yellowish-brown. The elytra have rows of punctures, with the intervals finely and widely punctate.
