= Pseudhammus occipitalis =

Scientific classification
- Kingdom: Animalia
- Phylum: Arthropoda
- Class: Insecta
- Order: Coleoptera
- Suborder: Polyphaga
- Infraorder: Cucujiformia
- Family: Cerambycidae
- Genus: Pseudhammus
- Species: P. occipitalis

Binomial name
- Pseudhammus occipitalis (Lameere, 1893)

Species of beetle

Pseudhammus occipitalis is a species of beetle in the family Cerambycidae. It was described by Lameere in 1893. It is known from the Ivory Coast and Ghana.
