= Pseudotrochalus dichrous =

Scientific classification
- Kingdom: Animalia
- Phylum: Arthropoda
- Clade: Pancrustacea
- Class: Insecta
- Order: Coleoptera
- Suborder: Polyphaga
- Infraorder: Scarabaeiformia
- Family: Scarabaeidae
- Genus: Pseudotrochalus
- Species: P. dichrous

Binomial name
- Pseudotrochalus dichrous (Gyllenhal, 1817)

Synonyms
- Melolontha dichroa Gyllenhal, 1817

Species of beetle

Pseudotrochalus dichrous is a species of beetle of the family Scarabaeidae. It is found in Cameroon, Gabon, the Democratic Republic of the Congo, the Republic of the Congo and Sierra Leone.

== Description ==
Adults reach a length of about 7 mm (0.28 in). They are mostly brown underneath, and blackish to black above. The clypeus is very short, with a very faint indication of a transverse ridge behind the narrow, slightly raised anterior margin. The elytra are very finely punctate. The rows of punctures are dull and simple, bordered by very indistinct, smooth striae.
