= Pseudhammus =

Scientific classification
- Kingdom: Animalia
- Phylum: Arthropoda
- Class: Insecta
- Order: Coleoptera
- Suborder: Polyphaga
- Infraorder: Cucujiformia
- Family: Cerambycidae
- Tribe: Lamiini
- Genus: Pseudhammus; Kolbe, 1894

Genus of beetles

Pseudhammus is a genus of longhorn beetles of the subfamily Lamiinae, containing the following species:

subgenus Allardhammus

- Pseudhammus rousseti Teocchi, Jiroux & Sudre, 2004

subgenus Litigiosus

- Pseudhammus alboplagiatus Breuning, 1935
- Pseudhammus burgeoni Breuning, 1935
- Pseudhammus congoanus (Duvivier, 1891)
- Pseudhammus congolensis (Hintz, 1913)
- Pseudhammus occidentalis (Dillon & Dillon, 1959)
- Pseudhammus occipitalis (Lameere, 1893)
- Pseudhammus oculifrons (Chevrolat, 1856)
- Pseudhammus rothschildi Gahan, 1909
- Pseudhammus similis (Dillon & Dillon, 1959)
- Pseudhammus vicinus Breuning, 1935

subgenus Pseudhammus

- Pseudhammus affinis Dillon & Dillon, 1959
- Pseudhammus albovariegatus Breuning, 1954
- Pseudhammus discoideus (Harold, 1879)
- Pseudhammus feae Aurivillius, 1910
- Pseudhammus impressifrons Dillon & Dillon, 1959
- Pseudhammus longicornis Dillon & Dillon, 1959
- Pseudhammus myrmidonum Kolbe, 1894
- Pseudhammus rhamnus Dillon & Dillon, 1959
- Pseudhammus shari Dillon & Dillon, 1959
- Pseudhammus vittatus Aurivillius, 1927
