= Pseudotrochalus calabaricus =

Scientific classification
- Kingdom: Animalia
- Phylum: Arthropoda
- Clade: Pancrustacea
- Class: Insecta
- Order: Coleoptera
- Suborder: Polyphaga
- Infraorder: Scarabaeiformia
- Family: Scarabaeidae
- Genus: Pseudotrochalus
- Species: P. calabaricus

Binomial name
- Pseudotrochalus calabaricus Moser, 1917

Species of beetle

Pseudotrochalus calabaricus is a species of beetle of the family Scarabaeidae. It is found in Nigeria.

== Description ==
Adults reach a length of about 6.5 mm. They are black above and brown below, and highly shiny. The head is strongly and densely punctate and the antennae are reddish-yellow. The pronotum is punctured.
