= Pseudhammus discoideus =

Scientific classification
- Kingdom: Animalia
- Phylum: Arthropoda
- Class: Insecta
- Order: Coleoptera
- Suborder: Polyphaga
- Infraorder: Cucujiformia
- Family: Cerambycidae
- Genus: Pseudhammus
- Species: P. discoideus

Binomial name
- Pseudhammus discoideus (Harold, 1879)

Species of beetle

Pseudhammus discoideus is a species of beetle in the family Cerambycidae. It was described by Harold in 1879.
