= Pseudotrochalus seriatipennis =

Scientific classification
- Kingdom: Animalia
- Phylum: Arthropoda
- Clade: Pancrustacea
- Class: Insecta
- Order: Coleoptera
- Suborder: Polyphaga
- Infraorder: Scarabaeiformia
- Family: Scarabaeidae
- Genus: Pseudotrochalus
- Species: P. seriatipennis

Binomial name
- Pseudotrochalus seriatipennis Moser, 1924

Species of beetle

Pseudotrochalus seriatipennis is a species of beetle of the family Scarabaeidae. It is found in Tanzania.

== Description ==
Adults reach a length of about 7.5 mm. They are blackish-brown and opaque, with shiny legs. The head is densely punctate and the antennae are reddish-yellow.
