= Pseudotrochalus gilsoni =

Scientific classification
- Kingdom: Animalia
- Phylum: Arthropoda
- Clade: Pancrustacea
- Class: Insecta
- Order: Coleoptera
- Suborder: Polyphaga
- Infraorder: Scarabaeiformia
- Family: Scarabaeidae
- Genus: Pseudotrochalus
- Species: P. gilsoni

Binomial name
- Pseudotrochalus gilsoni Moser, 1916

Species of beetle

Pseudotrochalus gilsoni is a species of beetle of the family Scarabaeidae. It is found in the Democratic Republic of the Congo.

== Description ==
Adults reach a length of about 8-8.5 mm. They are reddish-brown and dull above and faintly shiny below. The frons is rather finely punctate and the antennae are yellowish-brown. On the pronotum, the punctation is rather dense and fine and lateral margins are bristled in the anterior part. The elytra have rows of punctures and the intervals are shallow, widely spaced, and finely punctate.
