= Neonitocris flavipes =

Scientific classification
- Kingdom: Animalia
- Phylum: Arthropoda
- Class: Insecta
- Order: Coleoptera
- Suborder: Polyphaga
- Infraorder: Cucujiformia
- Family: Cerambycidae
- Genus: Neonitocris
- Species: N. flavipes

Binomial name
- Neonitocris flavipes Breuning, 1950

Species of beetle

Neonitocris flavipes is a species of beetle in the family Cerambycidae. It was described by Stephan von Breuning in 1950.
