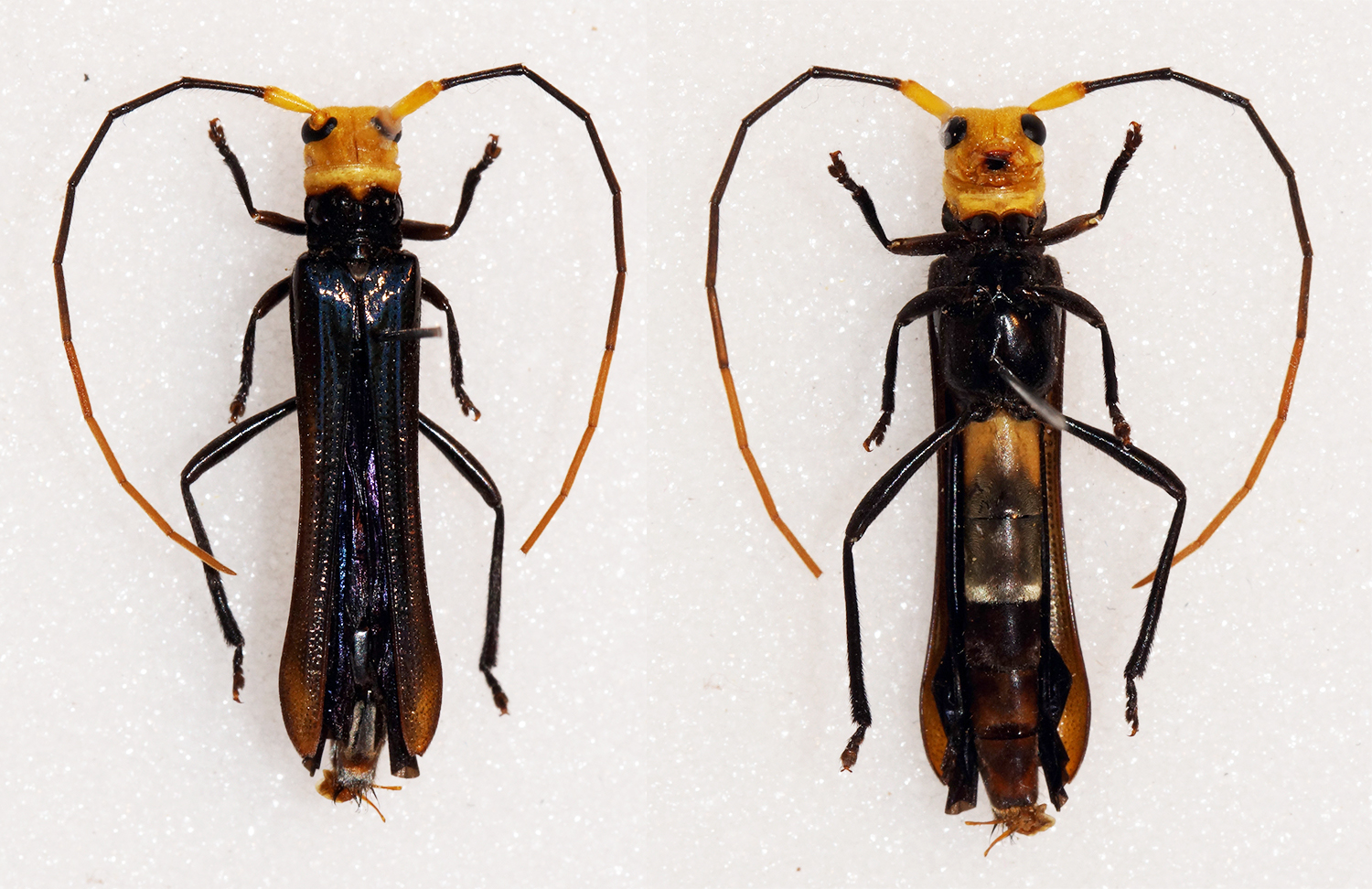

Scientific classification
- Domain: Eukaryota
- Kingdom: Animalia
- Phylum: Arthropoda
- Class: Insecta
- Order: Coleoptera
- Suborder: Polyphaga
- Infraorder: Cucujiformia
- Family: Cerambycidae
- Genus: Neonitocris
- Species: N. princeps

Binomial name
- Neonitocris princeps (Jordan, 1894)

Synonyms
- Nitocris princeps Jordan, 1894

= Neonitocris princeps =

Species of beetle

Neonitocris princeps is a species of beetle in the family Cerambycidae. It was described by Karl Jordan in 1894, originally under the genus Nitocris. It has a wide distribution in Africa.

== Subspecies ==
- Neonitocris princeps rhodesica Breuning, 1950
- Neonitocris princeps princeps (Jordan, 1894)
