= Lepitrichula luberoensis =

Scientific classification
- Kingdom: Animalia
- Phylum: Arthropoda
- Class: Insecta
- Order: Coleoptera
- Suborder: Polyphaga
- Infraorder: Scarabaeiformia
- Family: Scarabaeidae
- Genus: Lepitrichula
- Species: L. luberoensis

Binomial name
- Lepitrichula luberoensis (Burgeon, 1945)

Synonyms
- Lepithrix luberoensis Burgeon, 1945

Species of beetle

Lepitrichula luberoensis is a species of beetle of the family Scarabaeidae. It is found in Rwanda and the Democratic Republic of the Congo.

== Description ==
Adults reach a length of about 4.5–6 mm (0.18–0.24 in). They are black with reddish-brown elytra and brown forelegs. The elytra have a band of white scales along the suture, as well as a spot of white scales. The pygidium has a marginal band of white scales, and these white scales are also scattered on the underside.
