= Mesotrochalus docilis =

Scientific classification
- Kingdom: Animalia
- Phylum: Arthropoda
- Clade: Pancrustacea
- Class: Insecta
- Order: Coleoptera
- Suborder: Polyphaga
- Infraorder: Scarabaeiformia
- Family: Scarabaeidae
- Genus: Mesotrochalus
- Species: M. docilis

Binomial name
- Mesotrochalus docilis Kolbe, 1914

Species of beetle

Mesotrochalus docilis is a species of beetle of the family Scarabaeidae. It is found in Rwanda.

== Description ==
Adults reach a length of about 9 mm (0.35 in). They are reddish-brown and glossy, with a faint metallic sheen above. The pronotum is very abundantly, but moderately densely punctate, with the lateral margins almost straight, very weakly curved and the anterior angles pointed. The posterior angles are almost right-angled, and weakly and bluntly rounded. The scutellum is longer than wide, smoother at the base and apex. The elytra are widest behind the middle and the dorsal striae are paired. The pygidium is coarsely punctate.
