= Pseudotrochalus kulzeri =

Scientific classification
- Kingdom: Animalia
- Phylum: Arthropoda
- Class: Insecta
- Order: Coleoptera
- Suborder: Polyphaga
- Infraorder: Scarabaeiformia
- Family: Scarabaeidae
- Genus: Pseudotrochalus
- Species: P. kulzeri

Binomial name
- Pseudotrochalus kulzeri Frey, 1972

Species of beetle

Pseudotrochalus kulzeri is a species of beetle of the family Scarabaeidae. It is found in the Democratic Republic of the Congo.

== Description ==
Adults reach a length of about 8.5–10 mm. The upper and lower surfaces are dark reddish-brown, with the head somewhat darker. The antennae are light brown. The upper surface is faintly silky-shiny and the pronotum and elytra are sparsely ciliate.
