= Neonitocris postscutellaris =

Scientific classification
- Kingdom: Animalia
- Phylum: Arthropoda
- Class: Insecta
- Order: Coleoptera
- Suborder: Polyphaga
- Infraorder: Cucujiformia
- Family: Cerambycidae
- Genus: Neonitocris
- Species: N. postscutellaris

Binomial name
- Neonitocris postscutellaris Lepesme & Breuning, 1951

Species of beetle

Neonitocris postscutellaris is a species of beetle in the family Cerambycidae. It was described by Lepesme and Stephan von Breuning in 1951.
