= Pseudotrochalus =

Scientific classification
- Kingdom: Animalia
- Phylum: Arthropoda
- Clade: Pancrustacea
- Class: Insecta
- Order: Coleoptera
- Suborder: Polyphaga
- Infraorder: Scarabaeiformia
- Family: Scarabaeidae
- Subfamily: Sericinae
- Tribe: Sericini
- Genus: Pseudotrochalus; Quedenfeldt, 1884

Genus of leaf beetles

Pseudotrochalus is a genus of beetles belonging to the family Scarabaeidae.

== Species ==
- Pseudotrochalus aericollis Quedenfeldt, 1884
- Pseudotrochalus amitinus Kolbe, 1914
- Pseudotrochalus angolensis Moser, 1916
- Pseudotrochalus benguellanus Moser, 1918
- Pseudotrochalus benitoensis Brenske, 1903
- Pseudotrochalus bomuanus Brenske, 1899
- Pseudotrochalus brenskei Nonfried, 1892
- Pseudotrochalus byrrhoides (Thomson, 1858)
- Pseudotrochalus calabaricus Moser, 1917
- Pseudotrochalus chrysomelinus (Gerstaecker, 1867)
- Pseudotrochalus colmanti Brenske, 1899
- Pseudotrochalus concolor (Kolbe, 1883)
- Pseudotrochalus congoanus Brenske, 1903
- Pseudotrochalus congoensis Moser, 1924
- Pseudotrochalus consanguineus Moser, 1919
- Pseudotrochalus consimilis Kolbe, 1914
- Pseudotrochalus constrictus Moser, 1919
- Pseudotrochalus crinitus Burgeon, 1943
- Pseudotrochalus dahomeyanus Moser, 1916
- Pseudotrochalus densicollis Moser, 1924
- Pseudotrochalus dichrous (Gyllenhal, 1817)
- Pseudotrochalus durbanus Moser, 1917
- Pseudotrochalus ertli Moser, 1919
- Pseudotrochalus excisiceps Frey, 1974
- Pseudotrochalus falkensteini (Kolbe, 1883)
- Pseudotrochalus fallaciosus (Gerstaecker, 1884)
- Pseudotrochalus fraterculus Moser, 1916
- Pseudotrochalus fusculus Moser, 1916
- Pseudotrochalus gabonus Moser, 1916
- Pseudotrochalus gilsoni Moser, 1916
- Pseudotrochalus hutsebauti Burgeon, 1943
- Pseudotrochalus infans Moser, 1916
- Pseudotrochalus iridescens Frey, 1974
- Pseudotrochalus kigomanus Burgeon, 1943
- Pseudotrochalus kolleri Moser, 1916
- Pseudotrochalus kulzeri Frey, 1972
- Pseudotrochalus lamtoensis Frey, 1970
- Pseudotrochalus leontovitchi Burgeon, 1943
- Pseudotrochalus lepersonneae Burgeon, 1943
- Pseudotrochalus liberianus Moser, 1917
- Pseudotrochalus lomamiensis Burgeon, 1943
- Pseudotrochalus longithorax Brenske, 1903
- Pseudotrochalus lujai Moser, 1916
- Pseudotrochalus massarti Burgeon, 1943
- Pseudotrochalus minimus Burgeon, 1943
- Pseudotrochalus neavei Moser, 1916
- Pseudotrochalus niger Brenske, 1903
- Pseudotrochalus nigritus Moser, 1916
- Pseudotrochalus nigroaeneus Moser, 1916
- Pseudotrochalus nigrofuscus Moser, 1924
- Pseudotrochalus nigrosericatus Quedenfeldt, 1884
- Pseudotrochalus nigroviridis Kolbe, 1914
- Pseudotrochalus nitidulus Moser, 1917
- Pseudotrochalus parvulus Frey, 1970
- Pseudotrochalus piceoniger Moser, 1924
- Pseudotrochalus praecellens Moser, 1916
- Pseudotrochalus propinquus Moser, 1916
- Pseudotrochalus puncticollis Moser, 1918
- Pseudotrochalus pygmaeus Frey, 1968
- Pseudotrochalus quadrilineatus (Fabricius, 1801)
- Pseudotrochalus quadrisubmaculata Brenske, 1903
- Pseudotrochalus rufobrunneus (Kolbe, 1883)
- Pseudotrochalus rufolineatus (Harold, 1879)
- Pseudotrochalus rugosiceps Frey, 1974
- Pseudotrochalus sankuruensis Burgeon, 1943
- Pseudotrochalus schubotzi (Kolbe, 1914)
- Pseudotrochalus seriatipennis Moser, 1924
- Pseudotrochalus sericinus Moser, 1919
- Pseudotrochalus sexflabellatus Frey, 1968
- Pseudotrochalus sexlineatus Quedenfeldt, 1888
- Pseudotrochalus sjostedti Brenske, 1903
- Pseudotrochalus splendens Moser, 1917
- Pseudotrochalus subcostatus Moser, 1917
- Pseudotrochalus subnudus Kolbe, 1910
- Pseudotrochalus subtruncatus Quedenfeldt, 1884
- Pseudotrochalus sulcipennis (Gerstaecker, 1867)
- Pseudotrochalus superbus Quedenfeldt, 1884
- Pseudotrochalus urunguensis Moser, 1924
- Pseudotrochalus validipes Moser, 1924
