= Lepitrichula setosa =

Scientific classification
- Kingdom: Animalia
- Phylum: Arthropoda
- Class: Insecta
- Order: Coleoptera
- Suborder: Polyphaga
- Infraorder: Scarabaeiformia
- Family: Scarabaeidae
- Genus: Lepitrichula
- Species: L. setosa

Binomial name
- Lepitrichula setosa (Burmeister, 1844)

Synonyms
- Anisonyx setosus Burmeister, 1844; Lepitrix setosa; Anisonyx pilosus Boheman, 1857

Species of beetle

Lepitrichula setosa is a species of beetle of the family Scarabaeidae. It is found in Namibia, South Africa (KwaZulu-Natal, Gauteng, North West, Limpopo) and Zimbabwe.

== Description ==
Adults reach a length of about 5.5–6 mm (0.22–0.24 in). They are black, with the elytra testaceous-yellow and the legs piceous. The head and pronotum are densely hairy, the hairs greyish or slightly flavescent, but mixed with sub-squamose ones which are a little more squamosa along the base. The scutellum is clothed with squamose hairs. The elytra are clothed with short, black hairs and a few erect ones which are more numerous and longer in the basal part. On each side of the scutellum, and reaching to about the median part, is an arcuate band of sub-flavescent squamose hairs, as well as a transverse, ill-defined post-median patch of similar scales. The suture and the outer margins of the elytra are infuscate.
