= Lepitrichula ruandana =

Scientific classification
- Kingdom: Animalia
- Phylum: Arthropoda
- Class: Insecta
- Order: Coleoptera
- Suborder: Polyphaga
- Infraorder: Scarabaeiformia
- Family: Scarabaeidae
- Genus: Lepitrichula
- Species: L. ruandana

Binomial name
- Lepitrichula ruandana (Schein, 1956)

Synonyms
- Lepithrix ruandanus Schein, 1956

Species of beetle

Lepitrichula ruandana is a species of beetle of the family Scarabaeidae. It is found in Rwanda.

== Description ==
Adults reach a length of about 7 mm (0.28 in). They are black. On the posterior surface, black, grey, and brown hair-like scales radiate outwards from a point below the scutellum. There is a row of white scales surrounding the scutellum and the upper margin of the pygidium is covered with white scales.
