= Pseudhammus rousseti =

Scientific classification
- Kingdom: Animalia
- Phylum: Arthropoda
- Class: Insecta
- Order: Coleoptera
- Suborder: Polyphaga
- Infraorder: Cucujiformia
- Family: Cerambycidae
- Genus: Pseudhammus
- Species: P. rousseti

Binomial name
- Pseudhammus rousseti Teocchi, Jiroux & Sudre, 2004

Species of beetle

Pseudhammus rousseti is a species of beetle in the family Cerambycidae. It was described by Pierre Téocchi, Jiroux and Jérôme Sudre in 2004.
