= Pseudotrochalus iridescens =

Scientific classification
- Kingdom: Animalia
- Phylum: Arthropoda
- Class: Insecta
- Order: Coleoptera
- Suborder: Polyphaga
- Infraorder: Scarabaeiformia
- Family: Scarabaeidae
- Genus: Pseudotrochalus
- Species: P. iridescens

Binomial name
- Pseudotrochalus iridescens Frey, 1974

Species of beetle

Pseudotrochalus iridescens is a species of beetle of the family Scarabaeidae. It is found in Tanzania.

== Description ==
Adults reach a length of about 6 mm. The upper and lower surfaces are blackish-brown, the antennae yellowish-brown and the pronotum and elytra strongly iridescent. The pronotum is densely, shallowly, and finely punctate, with a shallow, rather broad median impression in the basal half. The base of the elytra is slightly tomentose. The elytra bear only very shallow and sparsely punctate, but incised striae.
