= Pseudotrochalus liberianus =

Scientific classification
- Kingdom: Animalia
- Phylum: Arthropoda
- Clade: Pancrustacea
- Class: Insecta
- Order: Coleoptera
- Suborder: Polyphaga
- Infraorder: Scarabaeiformia
- Family: Scarabaeidae
- Genus: Pseudotrochalus
- Species: P. liberianus

Binomial name
- Pseudotrochalus liberianus Moser, 1917

Species of beetle

Pseudotrochalus liberianus is a species of beetle of the family Scarabaeidae. It is found in Liberia.

== Description ==
Adults reach a length of about 7 mm. They are reddish-brown and shiny. The frons is densely covered with strong punctures and the antennae are yellow. The pronotum is densely covered with rather strong punctures and the elytra show somewhat indistinct rows of punctures, with the intervals shallow and moderately densely punctured.
