= Lepitrichula =

Scientific classification
- Kingdom: Animalia
- Phylum: Arthropoda
- Class: Insecta
- Order: Coleoptera
- Suborder: Polyphaga
- Infraorder: Scarabaeiformia
- Family: Scarabaeidae
- Subfamily: Melolonthinae
- Tribe: Hopliini
- Genus: Lepitrichula; Schein, 1959

Genus of leaf beetles

Lepitrichula is a genus of beetles belonging to the family Scarabaeidae.

== Species ==
- Lepitrichula lanata (Boheman, 1857)
- Lepitrichula luberoensis (Burgeon, 1945)
- Lepitrichula ruandana (Schein, 1956)
- Lepitrichula setosa (Burmeister, 1844)
- Lepitrichula vagans (Kolbe, 1891)
