= Pseudotrochalus byrrhoides =

Scientific classification
- Kingdom: Animalia
- Phylum: Arthropoda
- Class: Insecta
- Order: Coleoptera
- Suborder: Polyphaga
- Infraorder: Scarabaeiformia
- Family: Scarabaeidae
- Genus: Pseudotrochalus
- Species: P. byrrhoides

Binomial name
- Pseudotrochalus byrrhoides (Thomson, 1858)

Synonyms
- Trochalus byrrhoides Thomson, 1858; Autoserica byrrhoides

Species of beetle

Pseudotrochalus byrrhoides is a species of beetle of the family Scarabaeidae. It is found in Liberia, Gabon and the Democratic Republic of the Congo.

== Description ==
Adults reach a length of about 9 mm. They have a reddish-brown, dull, egg-shaped body, with a faint opalescent sheen and with tiny hairs on the upper and lower surfaces.
