= Pseudotrochalus quadrisubmaculata =

Scientific classification
- Kingdom: Animalia
- Phylum: Arthropoda
- Clade: Pancrustacea
- Class: Insecta
- Order: Coleoptera
- Suborder: Polyphaga
- Infraorder: Scarabaeiformia
- Family: Scarabaeidae
- Genus: Pseudotrochalus
- Species: P. quadrisubmaculata

Binomial name
- Pseudotrochalus quadrisubmaculata Brenske, 1903

Synonyms
- Pseudotrochalus quadrisubmaculatus

Species of beetle

Pseudotrochalus quadrisubmaculata is a species of beetle of the family Scarabaeidae. It is found in Cameroon, Gabon, Ghana, the Democratic Republic of the Congo and the Republic of the Congo.

== Description ==
Adults reach a length of about 6.5 mm (0.26 in). They have a broadly oval, dull and dark body. The elytra have two oblique, curved, yellowish-brown bands on each side. The pronotum is densely and finely punctate, with straight sides and an almost straight anterior margin, the front angles of which project distinctly. The elytra are densely tomentose.
