= Pseudotrochalus benitoensis =

Scientific classification
- Kingdom: Animalia
- Phylum: Arthropoda
- Clade: Pancrustacea
- Class: Insecta
- Order: Coleoptera
- Suborder: Polyphaga
- Infraorder: Scarabaeiformia
- Family: Scarabaeidae
- Genus: Pseudotrochalus
- Species: P. benitoensis

Binomial name
- Pseudotrochalus benitoensis Brenske, 1903

Species of beetle

Pseudotrochalus benitoensis is a species of beetle of the family Scarabaeidae. It is found in the Republic of the Congo.

== Description ==
Adults reach a length of about 9 mm (0.35 in). They have an elongate-oval, very densely tomentose, brown body, which is pruinose beneath. The clypeus is broad and weakly rounded and the anterior margin merges into the lateral margin without an indentation. The pronotum is very short, while the scutellum is broad and the elytra have simple rows of punctures.
