= Pseudotrochalus validipes =

Scientific classification
- Kingdom: Animalia
- Phylum: Arthropoda
- Clade: Pancrustacea
- Class: Insecta
- Order: Coleoptera
- Suborder: Polyphaga
- Infraorder: Scarabaeiformia
- Family: Scarabaeidae
- Genus: Pseudotrochalus
- Species: P. validipes

Binomial name
- Pseudotrochalus validipes Moser, 1924

Species of beetle

Pseudotrochalus validipes is a species of beetle of the family Scarabaeidae. It is found in eastern Africa and Zimbabwe.

== Description ==
Adults reach a length of about 10 mm. They have an oblong-oval, opaque body. They are blackish-brown above and dark beneath, with shiny legs. The antennae are rust-coloured.
