= Neonitocris bourgeati =

Scientific classification
- Kingdom: Animalia
- Phylum: Arthropoda
- Class: Insecta
- Order: Coleoptera
- Suborder: Polyphaga
- Infraorder: Cucujiformia
- Family: Cerambycidae
- Genus: Neonitocris
- Species: N. bourgeati

Binomial name
- Neonitocris bourgeati Breuning & Téocchi, 1978

Species of beetle

Neonitocris bourgeati is a species of beetle in the family Cerambycidae. It was described by Stephan von Breuning and Pierre Téocchi in 1978.
