= Stenoserica kolbei =

Scientific classification
- Kingdom: Animalia
- Phylum: Arthropoda
- Class: Insecta
- Order: Coleoptera
- Suborder: Polyphaga
- Infraorder: Scarabaeiformia
- Family: Scarabaeidae
- Genus: Stenoserica
- Species: S. kolbei

Binomial name
- Stenoserica kolbei Brenske, 1901

Species of beetle

Stenoserica kolbei is a species of beetle of the family Scarabaeidae. It is found in Tanzania.

== Description ==
Adults reach a length of about 5.5 mm. They are yellowish-reddish-brown with a vivid opalescent sheen, and very narrowly striated elytra. The frons is almost slightly depressed, with a fine longitudinal line. The pronotum is slightly rounded at the sides, with rounded hind angles. The elytra are hardly punctate in rows within the striae, but rather densely irregularly punctate, so that only very narrow raised intervals remain unpunctate.

== Etymology ==
The species is dedicated to Hermann Julius Kolbe.
