= Pseudhammus feae =

Scientific classification
- Kingdom: Animalia
- Phylum: Arthropoda
- Class: Insecta
- Order: Coleoptera
- Suborder: Polyphaga
- Infraorder: Cucujiformia
- Family: Cerambycidae
- Genus: Pseudhammus
- Species: P. feae

Binomial name
- Pseudhammus feae Aurivillius, 1910

Species of beetle

Pseudhammus feae is a species of beetle in the family Cerambycidae. It was described by Per Olof Christopher Aurivillius in 1910. It is known from Saint Thomas in the US Virgin Islands.
