= Philomecyna leleupi =

Scientific classification
- Kingdom: Animalia
- Phylum: Arthropoda
- Clade: Pancrustacea
- Class: Insecta
- Order: Coleoptera
- Suborder: Polyphaga
- Infraorder: Cucujiformia
- Family: Cerambycidae
- Genus: Philomecyna
- Species: P. leleupi

Binomial name
- Philomecyna leleupi Breuning, 1975

Species of beetle

Philomecyna leleupi is a species of beetle in the family Cerambycidae. It is known from the Uluguru Mountains, Tanzania.

Philomecyna leleupi measure 14 mm (0.55 in) in length.
