= Pseudotrochalus piceoniger =

Scientific classification
- Kingdom: Animalia
- Phylum: Arthropoda
- Clade: Pancrustacea
- Class: Insecta
- Order: Coleoptera
- Suborder: Polyphaga
- Infraorder: Scarabaeiformia
- Family: Scarabaeidae
- Genus: Pseudotrochalus
- Species: P. piceoniger

Binomial name
- Pseudotrochalus piceoniger Moser, 1924

Species of beetle

Pseudotrochalus piceoniger is a species of beetle of the family Scarabaeidae. It is found in Tanzania.

== Description ==
Adults reach a length of about 8 mm. They are blackish-brown and opaque, with shiny legs and the pronotum with a silky sheen. The head is moderately densely punctate. The antennae are ferruginous.
