= Pseudotrochalus subcostatus =

Scientific classification
- Kingdom: Animalia
- Phylum: Arthropoda
- Clade: Pancrustacea
- Class: Insecta
- Order: Coleoptera
- Suborder: Polyphaga
- Infraorder: Scarabaeiformia
- Family: Scarabaeidae
- Genus: Pseudotrochalus
- Species: P. subcostatus

Binomial name
- Pseudotrochalus subcostatus Moser, 1917

Species of beetle

Pseudotrochalus subcostatus is a species of beetle of the family Scarabaeidae. It is found in Ethiopia.

== Description ==
Adults reach a length of about 5.5–8 mm. They are black and shiny. The head, pronotum and scutellum are bronze-colored, and the underside is sometimes brown. The head is densely punctate and the antennae are yellow. The pronotum is densely punctate, as is the surface of the scutellum. The elytra show weakly wrinkled punctation.
