= Pseudotrochalus congoanus =

Scientific classification
- Kingdom: Animalia
- Phylum: Arthropoda
- Clade: Pancrustacea
- Class: Insecta
- Order: Coleoptera
- Suborder: Polyphaga
- Infraorder: Scarabaeiformia
- Family: Scarabaeidae
- Genus: Pseudotrochalus
- Species: P. congoanus

Binomial name
- Pseudotrochalus congoanus Brenske, 1903

Species of beetle

Pseudotrochalus congoanus is a species of beetle of the family Scarabaeidae. It is found in the Republic of the Congo.

== Description ==
Adults reach a length of about 9 mm (0.35 in). They have an oval and somewhat elongated, black body. The clypeus is broad, rounded in a very short semicircle, and coarsely rugose-punctate. The pronotum is strongly and densely punctate.
