= Pseudotrochalus densicollis =

Scientific classification
- Kingdom: Animalia
- Phylum: Arthropoda
- Clade: Pancrustacea
- Class: Insecta
- Order: Coleoptera
- Suborder: Polyphaga
- Infraorder: Scarabaeiformia
- Family: Scarabaeidae
- Genus: Pseudotrochalus
- Species: P. densicollis

Binomial name
- Pseudotrochalus densicollis Moser, 1924

Species of beetle

Pseudotrochalus densicollis is a species of beetle of the family Scarabaeidae. It is found in the Democratic Republic of the Congo.

== Description ==
Adults reach a length of about 7.5 mm (0.30 in). They have an oval, black, shining body. The head is densely punctate with a slightly rugose texture and the antennae are reddish-yellow. The elytra bear rows of punctures, with the intervals flat and covered with fairly dense punctures. The pygidium is moderately densely punctate.
