= Pseudotrochalus nitidulus =

Scientific classification
- Kingdom: Animalia
- Phylum: Arthropoda
- Clade: Pancrustacea
- Class: Insecta
- Order: Coleoptera
- Suborder: Polyphaga
- Infraorder: Scarabaeiformia
- Family: Scarabaeidae
- Genus: Pseudotrochalus
- Species: P. nitidulus

Binomial name
- Pseudotrochalus nitidulus Moser, 1917

Synonyms
- Pseudotrochalus nitidulus henrardi Burgeon, 1943; Pseudotrochalus tridenticeps Moser, 1924

Species of beetle

Pseudotrochalus nitidulus is a species of beetle of the family Scarabaeidae. It is found in the Democratic Republic of the Congo.

== Description ==
Adults reach a length of about 5.5 mm. They are black above and brown below, and shiny. The frons is strongly punctate and the antennae are brown with a yellow club. The pronotum is moderately densely punctate and the elytra have rows of punctures, the spaces between shallow and moderately densely filled with punctures.
