= Pseudhammus congoanus =

Scientific classification
- Kingdom: Animalia
- Phylum: Arthropoda
- Class: Insecta
- Order: Coleoptera
- Suborder: Polyphaga
- Infraorder: Cucujiformia
- Family: Cerambycidae
- Genus: Pseudhammus
- Species: P. congoanus

Binomial name
- Pseudhammus congoanus (Duvivier, 1891)

Species of beetle

Pseudhammus congoanus is a species of beetle in the family Cerambycidae. It was described by Duvivier in 1891.
