= Stenoserica =

Scientific classification
- Kingdom: Animalia
- Phylum: Arthropoda
- Class: Insecta
- Order: Coleoptera
- Suborder: Polyphaga
- Infraorder: Scarabaeiformia
- Family: Scarabaeidae
- Subfamily: Sericinae
- Tribe: Sericini
- Genus: Stenoserica; Brenske, 1900

Synonyms
- Odontoserica Kolbe, 1897

Genus of leaf beetles

Stenoserica is a genus of beetles belonging to the family Scarabaeidae.

== Species ==
- Stenoserica deceptor (Péringuey, 1892)
- Stenoserica delagoana Péringuey, 1904
- Stenoserica falsa Brenske, 1901
- Stenoserica freudei Frey, 1970
- Stenoserica interpunctata (Boheman, 1860)
- Stenoserica kolbei Brenske, 1901
- Stenoserica zambesiana (Brancsik, 1897)
- Stenoserica zambesicola Péringuey, 1904
