= Stenoserica zambesiana =

Scientific classification
- Kingdom: Animalia
- Phylum: Arthropoda
- Class: Insecta
- Order: Coleoptera
- Suborder: Polyphaga
- Infraorder: Scarabaeiformia
- Family: Scarabaeidae
- Genus: Stenoserica
- Species: S. zambesiana

Binomial name
- Stenoserica zambesiana (Brancsik, 1897)

Synonyms
- Serica zambesiana Brancsik, 1897

Species of beetle

Stenoserica zambesiana is a species of beetle of the family Scarabaeidae. It is found in Zimbabwe.

== Description ==
Adults reach a length of about 5–6 mm. They have a brownish, opaque, ovate body. The antennae are testaceous.
