= Stenoserica delagoana =

Scientific classification
- Kingdom: Animalia
- Phylum: Arthropoda
- Class: Insecta
- Order: Coleoptera
- Suborder: Polyphaga
- Infraorder: Scarabaeiformia
- Family: Scarabaeidae
- Genus: Stenoserica
- Species: S. delagoana

Binomial name
- Stenoserica delagoana Péringuey, 1904

Species of beetle

Stenoserica delagoana is a species of beetle of the family Scarabaeidae. It is found in Mozambique.

== Description ==
Adults reach a length of about 7-7.5 mm. They are very pale testaceous and slightly iridescent. The antennae are slightly flavescent in males, but reddish in females. The prothorax is not distinctly punctulate, while the scutellum is faintly punctulate. The elytra are finely but not deeply punctato-striate with the intervals nearly plane and faintly punctulate, and having along the suture and each alternate interval a series of very remote but quite conspicuous bristle-like hairs.
