= Neoserica fullonica =

Scientific classification
- Kingdom: Animalia
- Phylum: Arthropoda
- Class: Insecta
- Order: Coleoptera
- Suborder: Polyphaga
- Infraorder: Scarabaeiformia
- Family: Scarabaeidae
- Genus: Neoserica
- Species: N. fullonica

Binomial name
- Neoserica fullonica (Brenske, 1901)

Synonyms
- Lepiserica fullonica Brenske, 1901; Autoserica fullonica

Species of beetle

Neoserica fullonica is a species of beetle of the family Scarabaeidae. It is found in the Democratic Republic of the Congo.

== Description ==
Adults reach a length of about 10 mm. They are dark reddish-brown and very dull. The ribs of the raised, striped elytra are interrupted by lower-lying, bulky scale-like ridges. The pronotum is only slightly widened posteriorly, very widely punctate, extremely fine and weakly scale-like with barer patches. The scutellum is somewhat more densely and distinctly scaled. The ribs of the elytra are distinctly raised, dark, and interrupted by depressions. In these, the fine, hair-like scales stand out in a bulky manner, so that no white scale patches form. Besides these, there are also scattered fine scales and a few stronger ones on the sides. The narrower lateral margin is densely setate.
