= Pseudotrochalus benguellanus =

Scientific classification
- Kingdom: Animalia
- Phylum: Arthropoda
- Clade: Pancrustacea
- Class: Insecta
- Order: Coleoptera
- Suborder: Polyphaga
- Infraorder: Scarabaeiformia
- Family: Scarabaeidae
- Genus: Pseudotrochalus
- Species: P. benguellanus

Binomial name
- Pseudotrochalus benguellanus Moser, 1918

Species of beetle

Pseudotrochalus benguellanus is a species of beetle of the family Scarabaeidae. It is found in Angola.

== Description ==
Adults reach a length of about 8 mm. The head, pronotum and scutellum are olive-green and the elytra are reddish-brown. The underside is brown or blackish-green. The pronotum has fine and dense punctures and the elytra have rows of punctures, with the intervals sparsely punctured.
