= Neoserica benigna =

Scientific classification
- Kingdom: Animalia
- Phylum: Arthropoda
- Class: Insecta
- Order: Coleoptera
- Suborder: Polyphaga
- Infraorder: Scarabaeiformia
- Family: Scarabaeidae
- Genus: Neoserica
- Species: N. benigna

Binomial name
- Neoserica benigna (Brenske, 1901)

Synonyms
- Lepiserica benigna Brenske, 1901; Autoserica benigna

Species of beetle

Neoserica benigna is a species of beetle of the family Scarabaeidae. It is found in South Africa (KwaZulu-Natal).

== Description ==
Adults reach a length of about 8 mm. Adults are just as dark brown as Neoserica barbata, and very like this species also in the elongate form, but more reddish-brown on the under side. The elytra are irregularly punctate in the striae, the interspaces lightly raised, with tiny bristles in the punctures, and more distinct white bristles in rows.
