= Neoserica barbata =

Scientific classification
- Kingdom: Animalia
- Phylum: Arthropoda
- Class: Insecta
- Order: Coleoptera
- Suborder: Polyphaga
- Infraorder: Scarabaeiformia
- Family: Scarabaeidae
- Genus: Neoserica
- Species: N. barbata

Binomial name
- Neoserica barbata (Brenske, 1901)

Synonyms
- Autoserica barbata Brenske, 1901

Species of beetle

Neoserica barbata is a species of beetle of the family Scarabaeidae. It is found in South Africa (KwaZulu-Natal).

== Description ==
Adults reach a length of about 8.5 mm. They are very dark-brown, with the legs, antennae and mouth parts reddish-brown. The prothorax is also reddish-brown and shining.
