= Hermann Julius Kolbe =

German entomologist (1855-1939)

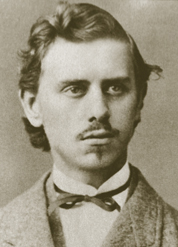
Hermann Julius Kolbe

Hermann Julius Kolbe (2 June 1855, Halle, Province of Westphalia – 26 November 1939) was a German entomologist from Halle, Westphalia. He was curator at the Berlin Zoological Museum from 1890 until 1921 specialising in Coleoptera, Psocoptera and Neuroptera. He died in Berlin-Lichterfelde.

Kolbe was born in Halle and studied at the University of Munster but did not complete due to problems with health and family. He worked as a teacher in Oeding from 1878 to 1882 and then joined the entomology department of the Zoologisches Museum at Berlin and became a curator of Coleoptera and Neuroptera in 1921. One of his interests was in the Scarabaeidae.

== Works ==
Partial list:

- Beziehungen unter der Arten von Poecilaspis (Cassididae) nebst Beschreibung einer von Herrn R. Rohde in Paraguay endeckten neuen Species dieser Gattung. Ent. Nachr., 13: 10-13 (1887).
- Beiträge zur Zoogeographie Westafrikas nebst einem Bericht über die während der Loango-Expedition von Herrn Dr. Falkenstein bei Chinchoxo gesammelten Coleoptera. Nova Acta Leop.-Carol. Deutsch. Akad. Naturf., 1, 3: 155-364 + 3 pl.(1887). (Also published as a book by E. Blochmann & Sohn, Dresden).
- Eine von Herrn Dr. med. Drake in Paraguay entdeckte neue Canistra-art. Ent. Nachr., 13: 27 (1887).
- Käfer und Netzflüger Ost-Afrikas. In: K. Möbius (ed.), Deutsch-Ost-Afrika. Wissenschaftliche Forschungsresultate über Land und Leute unseres ostafrikanischen Schutzgebietes und der Angrenzenden Lä nder. Band IV. Die Thierwelt Ost-Afrikas und der Nachbargebiete. Wirbellose Thiere. Verlag Dietrich Reimer (Ernst Vohsen), Berlin (1898).

== Collections ==
- Museum für Naturkunde, Berlin
- Westfälische Museum für Naturkunde
- Museum of Natural History at University of Wrocław
