= Apogonia mashona =

Scientific classification
- Kingdom: Animalia
- Phylum: Arthropoda
- Clade: Pancrustacea
- Class: Insecta
- Order: Coleoptera
- Suborder: Polyphaga
- Infraorder: Scarabaeiformia
- Family: Scarabaeidae
- Genus: Apogonia
- Species: A. mashona

Binomial name
- Apogonia mashona Péringuey, 1904

Species of beetle

Apogonia mashona is a species of beetle of the family Scarabaeidae. It is found in Zimbabwe.

== Description ==
Adults reach a length of about 7–7.25 mm (0.276–0.285 in). They are testaceous-red, turning to bronze-green on the elytra. In shape it closely resembles Apogonia curtula and Apogonia improba, but it is at once distinguished by the constantly smaller size, and the much deeper and coarser punctures on the upper part, and also by the shape of the clypeus which is not so sharply diagonally narrowed laterally nor so truncate in front in the male, and not at all sinuate there in the female.
