= Apogonia yunnana =

Scientific classification
- Kingdom: Animalia
- Phylum: Arthropoda
- Clade: Pancrustacea
- Class: Insecta
- Order: Coleoptera
- Suborder: Polyphaga
- Infraorder: Scarabaeiformia
- Family: Scarabaeidae
- Genus: Apogonia
- Species: A. yunnana

Binomial name
- Apogonia yunnana Moser, 1915

Species of beetle

Apogonia yunnana is a species of beetle of the family Scarabaeidae. It is found in China (Yunnan).

== Description ==
Adults reach a length of about 7 mm. The species is similar in color and shape to Apogonia uniformis, but differs in the dentition of the fore tibiae. The frons is moderately densely punctured and the antennae are yellowish-brown. The punctures on the pronotum are slightly more widely spaced than on the frons. The scutellum is completely smooth. The punctures on the elytra are somewhat coarser than those on the pronotum and also slightly more densely spaced. The narrow ribs are unpunctate.
