= Apogonia boettcheri =

Scientific classification
- Kingdom: Animalia
- Phylum: Arthropoda
- Clade: Pancrustacea
- Class: Insecta
- Order: Coleoptera
- Suborder: Polyphaga
- Infraorder: Scarabaeiformia
- Family: Scarabaeidae
- Genus: Apogonia
- Species: A. boettcheri

Binomial name
- Apogonia boettcheri Moser, 1915

Species of beetle

Apogonia boettcheri is a species of beetle of the family Scarabaeidae. It is found in the Philippines (Palawan).

== Description ==
Adults reach a length of about 12 mm. They are very similar to Apogonia borneensis, but the elytra show only a very faint purple sheen. The frons, especially in the anterior part, is quite sparsely punctate, but not as sparsely as in A. borneensis. The frons also does not show the slight flattening seen in that species. The pronotum is similarly shaped and sculpted in both species, but the punctures on it are even finer. The scutellum is completely smooth. The elytra do not show the fine, leathery wrinkles as in A. borneensis. Also, the extremely tiny bristle-covered punctures are slightly stronger. The flat ribs are likewise only marked by the surrounding rows of punctures and, since they are punctured in the same way as the spaces between them, are only indistinctly visible.
