= Apogonia sossiana =

Scientific classification
- Kingdom: Animalia
- Phylum: Arthropoda
- Clade: Pancrustacea
- Class: Insecta
- Order: Coleoptera
- Suborder: Polyphaga
- Infraorder: Scarabaeiformia
- Family: Scarabaeidae
- Genus: Apogonia
- Species: A. sossiana

Binomial name
- Apogonia sossiana Kolbe, 1914

Species of beetle

Apogonia sossiana is a species of beetle of the family Scarabaeidae. It is found in Tanzania.

== Description ==
Adults reach a length of about 6.75 mm (0.266 in). They are similar to Apogonia subaenea, but somewhat slimmer. The frons is less broad, the clypeus weakly emarginate. The pronotum is somewhat narrower, but otherwise similar. The scutellum is also narrower. The elytra appear somewhat less bulbous and the ribs are less prominent. The legs, especially the hind legs, are more robustly built. The pygidium is much more densely and finely punctate and has a median longitudinal groove. The abdomen is more densely punctate. The punctures all bear a strong bristle.
