= Apogonia heynei =

Scientific classification
- Kingdom: Animalia
- Phylum: Arthropoda
- Clade: Pancrustacea
- Class: Insecta
- Order: Coleoptera
- Suborder: Polyphaga
- Infraorder: Scarabaeiformia
- Family: Scarabaeidae
- Genus: Apogonia
- Species: A. heynei

Binomial name
- Apogonia heynei Moser, 1918

Species of beetle

Apogonia heynei is a species of beetle of the family Scarabaeidae. It is found on Sabah.

== Description ==
Adults reach a length of about 7 mm. They are brown. The frons is sparsely punctate and the antennae are yellowish-brown. The pronotum is moderately densely covered with more or less strong punctures and the elytra show strong punctation. The ribs appear somewhat convex due to the deep rows of punctures. The underside is more densely punctured in the middle then at the sides. The punctures have small, light setae at the edges of the underside.
