= Apogonia rauca =

Scientific classification
- Kingdom: Animalia
- Phylum: Arthropoda
- Clade: Pancrustacea
- Class: Insecta
- Order: Coleoptera
- Suborder: Polyphaga
- Infraorder: Scarabaeiformia
- Family: Scarabaeidae
- Genus: Apogonia
- Species: A. rauca

Binomial name
- Apogonia rauca (Fabricius, 1781)

Synonyms
- Melolontha rauca Fabricius, 1781; Apogonia rauca unistriata Brenske, 1900; Apogonia intacta Kolbe, 1899; Apogonia liberata Kolbe, 1899; Apogonia soluta Kolbe, 1899; Anomala punctatissima Walker, 1859; Apogonia gemellata Kirby, 1818

Species of beetle

Apogonia rauca is a species of dung beetle found in India and Sri Lanka.

== Description ==
This large beetle is stoutly built with an average length between 7 and 8 mm. Body shining dark brown.

It is a major pest of Arachis hypogaea. Grubs fed on the nodules, rootlets and immature pods whereas adults damage leaves. Heavy infestations cause stunted plants. Both grub and pupal stages lasted for 60-75 and 7-10 days, respectively. They attack the plants throughout the peanut season from July to October. Grubs and adults can be eradicated by using monocrotophos and chlorpyrifos.

Apart from groundnut, they are found extensively on rose flowers. Small numbers appeared in April and infestations continued until the mid August with a break during June. Adults are also known to feed on guava leaves.
