= Apogonia asaitoae =

Scientific classification
- Kingdom: Animalia
- Phylum: Arthropoda
- Clade: Pancrustacea
- Class: Insecta
- Order: Coleoptera
- Suborder: Polyphaga
- Infraorder: Scarabaeiformia
- Family: Scarabaeidae
- Genus: Apogonia
- Species: A. asaitoae

Binomial name
- Apogonia asaitoae Kobayashi, 2017

Species of beetle

Apogonia asaitoae is a species of beetle of the family Scarabaeidae. It is found in Vietnam.

== Description ==
Adults reach a length of about 12.5 mm. They have an elongate oval, moderately convex body. The elytra and ventral surface are dark blackish brown, while the head and pronotum are much darker. The antennae and tarsi are reddish brown to light reddish brown. Both the dorsal and ventral surfaces have similar dull shining. The dorsal surface is glabrous, while the ventral surface is covered with fine and short hairs.

== Etymology ==
The species is dedicated to Ms. Akiko Saito who collected the type specimen.
