= Apogonia siamensis =

Scientific classification
- Kingdom: Animalia
- Phylum: Arthropoda
- Clade: Pancrustacea
- Class: Insecta
- Order: Coleoptera
- Suborder: Polyphaga
- Infraorder: Scarabaeiformia
- Family: Scarabaeidae
- Genus: Apogonia
- Species: A. siamensis

Binomial name
- Apogonia siamensis Moser, 1915

Species of beetle

Apogonia siamensis is a species of beetle of the family Scarabaeidae. It is found in Thailand.

== Description ==
Adults reach a length of about 9 mm. They are reddish-brown, while the head and pronotum are blackish. The head is densely punctate and the antennae are yellowish-brown. The pronotum is extremely densely punctured. The elytra are coarsely punctured, the punctures with tiny pale setae. The two dorsal ribs of the elytra are narrow and almost devoid of punctures, while the medial rib has a longitudinal row of punctures.
