= Apogonia padangensis =

Scientific classification
- Kingdom: Animalia
- Phylum: Arthropoda
- Clade: Pancrustacea
- Class: Insecta
- Order: Coleoptera
- Suborder: Polyphaga
- Infraorder: Scarabaeiformia
- Family: Scarabaeidae
- Genus: Apogonia
- Species: A. padangensis

Binomial name
- Apogonia padangensis Moser, 1917

Species of beetle

Apogonia padangensis is a species of beetle of the family Scarabaeidae. It is found in Indonesia (Sumatra).

== Description ==
Adults reach a length of about 9 mm. They are brown, the upper surface with a green and coppery shimmer. The frons is sparsely punctate. The pronotum is moderately densely and finely punctate, the punctures becoming slightly bolder towards the sides, a median longitudinal line is unpunctate. The scutellum is almost unpunctate. The elytra are quite sparsely covered with punctures, and the ribs are flat and only indistinctly marked by the surrounding rows of punctures.
