= Apogonia tangana =

Scientific classification
- Kingdom: Animalia
- Phylum: Arthropoda
- Clade: Pancrustacea
- Class: Insecta
- Order: Coleoptera
- Suborder: Polyphaga
- Infraorder: Scarabaeiformia
- Family: Scarabaeidae
- Genus: Apogonia
- Species: A. tangana

Binomial name
- Apogonia tangana Moser, 1917

Species of beetle

Apogonia tangana is a species of beetle of the family Scarabaeidae. It is found in Tanzania.

== Description ==
Adults reach a length of about 8.5 mm. They are dark reddish-brown and shiny. The head is quite densely punctured. The pronotum is moderately densely covered with rather strong punctures. The elytra are strongly punctured, the somewhat convex ribs with only scattered punctures, bordered by rows of punctures. The underside is widely covered with punctures in the middle, while the punctures become closer together towards the sides. The punctures have white setae.
