= Apogonia insularis =

Scientific classification
- Kingdom: Animalia
- Phylum: Arthropoda
- Clade: Pancrustacea
- Class: Insecta
- Order: Coleoptera
- Suborder: Polyphaga
- Infraorder: Scarabaeiformia
- Family: Scarabaeidae
- Genus: Apogonia
- Species: A. insularis

Binomial name
- Apogonia insularis Moser, 1917

Species of beetle

Apogonia insularis is a species of beetle of the family Scarabaeidae. It is found in Indonesia (Sumatra).

== Description ==
Adults reach a length of about 9 mm. They are brown, with a coppery and green shimmer. The frons is moderately densely covered with deep punctures. On the pronotum, the punctures are somewhat closer together than in the similar species Apogonia fulgida. The scutellum bears fine and widely spaced punctures. The elytra are similarly sculpted to those in A. fulgida, but the punctures are somewhat bolder. The punctures show traces of setae.
