= Apogonia sibutensis =

Scientific classification
- Kingdom: Animalia
- Phylum: Arthropoda
- Clade: Pancrustacea
- Class: Insecta
- Order: Coleoptera
- Suborder: Polyphaga
- Infraorder: Scarabaeiformia
- Family: Scarabaeidae
- Genus: Apogonia
- Species: A. sibutensis

Binomial name
- Apogonia sibutensis Moser, 1917

Species of beetle

Apogonia sibutensis is a species of beetle of the family Scarabaeidae. It is found in Cameroon and the Central African Republic.

== Description ==
Adults reach a length of about 6-6.5 mm. They are blackish-brown. The pronotum is moderately densely punctured and the elytra have strong punctures, with unpunctate, narrow ribs which are bordered by rows of punctures. The underside is sparsely punctate in the middle, more densely punctate laterally. The punctures are light-coloured with setae.
