= Apogonia mindanaoana =

Scientific classification
- Kingdom: Animalia
- Phylum: Arthropoda
- Clade: Pancrustacea
- Class: Insecta
- Order: Coleoptera
- Suborder: Polyphaga
- Infraorder: Scarabaeiformia
- Family: Scarabaeidae
- Genus: Apogonia
- Species: A. mindanaoana

Binomial name
- Apogonia mindanaoana Moser, 1915

Species of beetle

Apogonia mindanaoana is a species of beetle of the family Scarabaeidae. It is found in the Philippines (Mindanao).

== Description ==
Adults reach a length of about 7 mm (0.28 in). They are shiny, with a bronze-green colour. The underside is brown shimmering, and the tarsi are brown. All punctures on the upper and lower surface bear light, scale-like bristles. The head is coarsely, somewhat wrinkled-punctate, the suture is distinct, slightly curved backwards in the middle. Behind the suture is a narrow, smooth stripe. The anterior margin of the clypeus is straight truncated, the corners are rounded. The antennae are brown. The pronotum is more than twice as wide as it is long at the base, arched behind the middle, the hind angles are obtuse, indistinctly rounded, the weakly projecting anterior angles are almost right-angled. The upper surface is densely punctate, and the punctation becomes somewhat wrinkled towards the lateral margins. The scutellum bears a few fine punctures in the middle. The punctures of the elytra are strong and rather closely spaced. The ribs are flat and only indistinctly marked by the surrounding rows of punctures. The pygidium bears large umbilical punctures, and the setae of the punctures in the posterior half of the pygidium are more hair-like. The underside is moderately densely punctured in the middle, becoming more closely punctured towards the sides.
