= Apogonia pectoralis =

Scientific classification
- Kingdom: Animalia
- Phylum: Arthropoda
- Clade: Pancrustacea
- Class: Insecta
- Order: Coleoptera
- Suborder: Polyphaga
- Infraorder: Scarabaeiformia
- Family: Scarabaeidae
- Genus: Apogonia
- Species: A. pectoralis

Binomial name
- Apogonia pectoralis Moser, 1917

Species of beetle

Apogonia pectoralis is a species of beetle of the family Scarabaeidae. It is found in the Philippines (Luzon).

== Description ==
Adults reach a length of about 5 mm. They are bronze-green above, and brown below, with a more or less greenish sheen. The head is quite densely covered with strong punctures. The pronotum is moderately densely punctured, while the scutellum is smooth. The elytra are covered with strong punctures, except in the space between the suture and the first rib, the punctures are arranged in rows.
