= Apogonia feai =

Scientific classification
- Kingdom: Animalia
- Phylum: Arthropoda
- Clade: Pancrustacea
- Class: Insecta
- Order: Coleoptera
- Suborder: Polyphaga
- Infraorder: Scarabaeiformia
- Family: Scarabaeidae
- Genus: Apogonia
- Species: A. feai

Binomial name
- Apogonia feai Moser, 1918

Species of beetle

Apogonia feai is a species of beetle of the family Scarabaeidae. It is found in Myanmar.

== Description ==
Adults reach a length of about 6–7 mm. They are yellowish-brown, with a faint metallic sheen. The frons is widely punctate and the antennae are yellow. The pronotum is moderately, sometimes even quite sparsely, punctured and the elytra are strongly punctured. The underside is widely punctured in the middle and more densely on the sides. The punctures are covered with light setae.
