= Apogonia nigroaenea =

Scientific classification
- Kingdom: Animalia
- Phylum: Arthropoda
- Clade: Pancrustacea
- Class: Insecta
- Order: Coleoptera
- Suborder: Polyphaga
- Infraorder: Scarabaeiformia
- Family: Scarabaeidae
- Genus: Apogonia
- Species: A. nigroaenea

Binomial name
- Apogonia nigroaenea Moser, 1915

Synonyms
- Apogonia subaenea Moser, 1915 (preocc.)

Species of beetle

Apogonia nigroaenea is a species of beetle of the family Scarabaeidae. It is found in Indonesia (Sumatra).

== Description ==
Adults reach a length of about 9 mm. They are black with a faint bronze shimmer. The frons is covered with rather strong, but not densely spaced, punctures. The antennae are reddish-brown. The pronotum is densely punctured, and the punctures, like those of the elytra, have tiny light setae. The scutellum has only a few fine punctures. On the elytra, the punctures are somewhat more widely spaced than on the pronotum.
