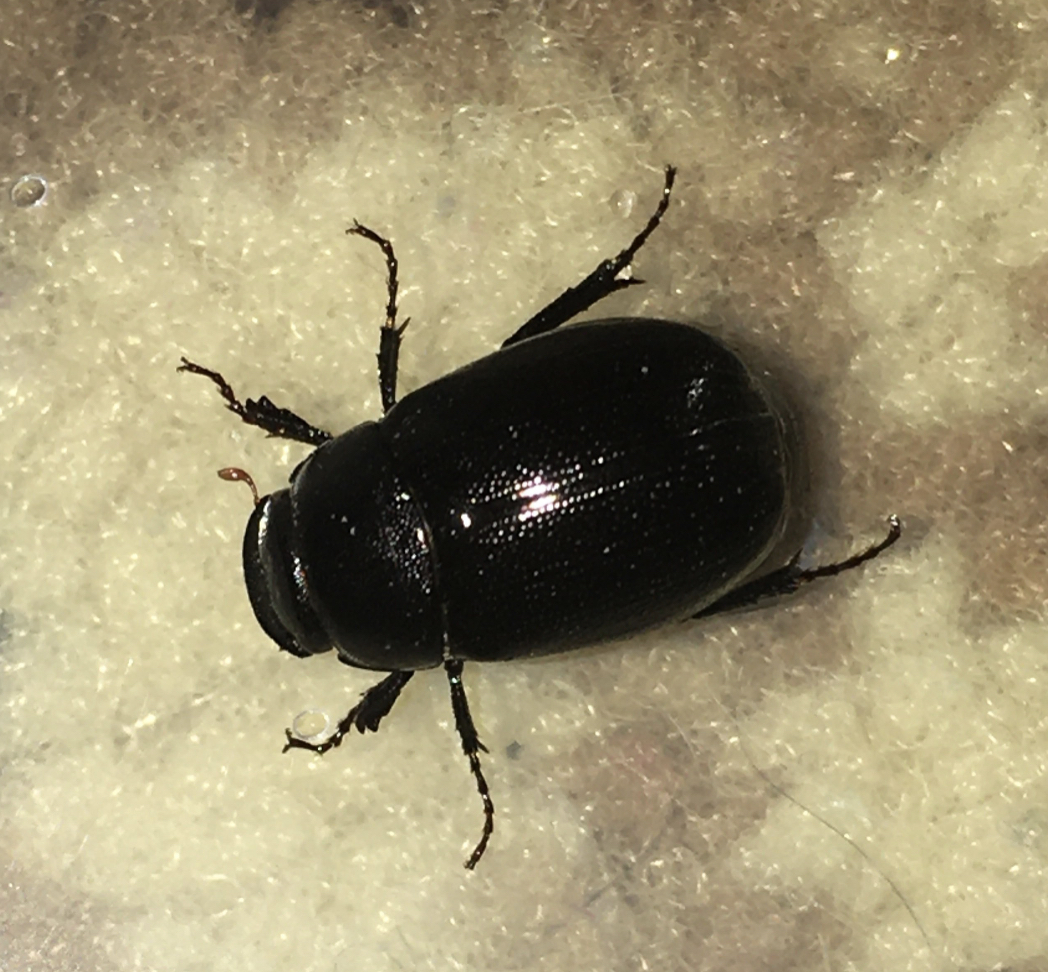
- Apogonia expeditionis

Scientific classification
- Kingdom: Animalia
- Phylum: Arthropoda
- Clade: Pancrustacea
- Class: Insecta
- Order: Coleoptera
- Suborder: Polyphaga
- Infraorder: Scarabaeiformia
- Superfamily: Scarabaeoidea
- Family: Scarabaeidae
- Subfamily: Melolonthinae
- Tribe: Diplotaxini
- Genus: Apogonia; Kirby, 1818

Synonyms
- Trigonostoma Walker, 1859 (preocc.)

= Apogonia =

Genus of beetles

Apogonia is a genus of scarab beetles. Some are pests of durian trees.

== Species ==
- Apogonia abbreviata Kobayashi, 2019
- Apogonia abdominalis Ritsema, 1896
- Apogonia abyssinica Kolbe, 1899
- Apogonia accepta Kobayashi, 2010
- Apogonia acehensis Kobayashi, 2017
- Apogonia acutangularis Kolbe, 1899
- Apogonia adoretoides Ritsema, 1897
- Apogonia aenea Moser, 1917
- Apogonia aeneocuprea Moser, 1915
- Apogonia aenescens Hope, 1831
- Apogonia aequabilis Karsch, 1882
- Apogonia aerata Moser, 1916
- Apogonia aerea Blanchard, 1851
- Apogonia affinis Kolbe, 1883
- Apogonia africana Laporte, 1840
- Apogonia akikoae Kobayashi, 2009
- Apogonia albomaculata Kobayashi, 2010
- Apogonia alkmaarensis Heller, 1914
- Apogonia amabilis Kobayashi & Bezděk, 2011
- Apogonia amaura Heller, 1896
- Apogonia amida Lewis, 1896
- Apogonia amitina Kolbe, 1899
- Apogonia amplidentifera Kobayashi, 2017
- Apogonia andamana Moser, 1913
- Apogonia angulata Kobayashi, 2010
- Apogonia angusta Moser, 1926
- Apogonia angusticlypea Kobayashi & Lien, 2020
- Apogonia angustipes Moser, 1924
- Apogonia annamensis Moser, 1913
- Apogonia apicalis Moser, 1908
- Apogonia armadillo Arrow, 1938
- Apogonia arta Karsch, 1882
- Apogonia aruensis Moser, 1913
- Apogonia asaitoae Kobayashi, 2017
- Apogonia asperata Kobayashi, 2015
- Apogonia assamensis Moser, 1919
- Apogonia astoni Kobayashi, 2019
- Apogonia australensis Lacroix, 2008
- Apogonia badia Moser, 1915
- Apogonia baii Kobayashi, 2019
- Apogonia bakeri Moser, 1915
- Apogonia bakunensis Kobayashi, 2013
- Apogonia balocauensis Kobayashi, 2014
- Apogonia banosana Moser, 1924
- Apogonia baolocensis Kobayashi, 2008
- Apogonia basalis Moser, 1915
- Apogonia basiventris Ritsema, 1913
- Apogonia batjana Moser, 1913
- Apogonia bawangensis Kobayashi, 2012
- Apogonia bazilanensis Kobayashi, 2014
- Apogonia becqueti Burgeon, 1945
- Apogonia belutschistanica Petrovitz, 1958
- Apogonia benguetana Moser, 1924
- Apogonia berastagiana Kobayashi, 2017
- Apogonia bezdeki Kobayashi, 2012
- Apogonia bicarinata Lewis, 1896
- Apogonia bicolor Kobayashi, 2007
- Apogonia blanchardi Ritsema, 1898
- Apogonia boettcheri Moser, 1915
- Apogonia bolikhamsaiana Kobayashi, 2010
- Apogonia bomuana Brenske, 1899
- Apogonia borneensis Moser, 1915
- Apogonia brenskei Ritsema, 1897
- Apogonia brevicollis Moser, 1915
- Apogonia brevis Sharp, 1881
- Apogonia brevisetosa Moser, 1913
- Apogonia brunneipennis Moser, 1913
- Apogonia buettikoferi Ritsema, 1896
- Apogonia bullaventris Kobayashi, 2012
- Apogonia burgeoni Bezděk, 2004
- Apogonia burmanica Ritsema, 1913
- Apogonia buruensis Moser, 1913
- Apogonia calcuttana Moser, 1916
- Apogonia callosifrons Moser, 1924
- Apogonia calva Karsch, 1882
- Apogonia cambodjensis Moser, 1914
- Apogonia cameronensis Kobayashi, 2017
- Apogonia caobangensis Kobayashi, 2008
- Apogonia carinata Kobayashi, 2013
- Apogonia carlotae Chapin, 1931
- Apogonia castanea Moser, 1913
- Apogonia castaneifemorata Kobayashi, 2015
- Apogonia castaneipennis Moser, 1914
- Apogonia cava Karsch, 1882
- Apogonia cavifrons Moser, 1926
- Apogonia cechovskyi Kobayashi, 2017
- Apogonia celebiana Fairmaire, 1893
- Apogonia centralis Arrow, 1941
- Apogonia cephalus Heller, 1897
- Apogonia ceramensis Moser, 1913
- Apogonia chabaudi Lacroix, Coache & Filippi, 2022
- Apogonia cinerascens Fairmaire, 1893
- Apogonia clypeata Moser, 1913
- Apogonia coiffaiti Lacroix, 2008
- Apogonia colini Moser, 1917
- Apogonia communis Kobayashi, 2015
- Apogonia comosa Karsch, 1882
- Apogonia complanata Kobayashi, 2020
- Apogonia confinis Kobayashi, 2019
- Apogonia congoensis Moser, 1918
- Apogonia consimilis Kobayashi, 2010
- Apogonia conspersa Boisduval, 1835
- Apogonia contracta Kolbe, 1899
- Apogonia contractclypea Kobayashi, 2012
- Apogonia convexa Moser, 1917
- Apogonia coriacea Waterhouse, 1877
- Apogonia corporaali Moser, 1924
- Apogonia crassipes Moser, 1919
- Apogonia crassitarsis Kobayashi, 2013
- Apogonia crenulata Kobayashi, 2013
- Apogonia cribrata Lansberge, 1879
- Apogonia cribricollis Burmeister, 1855
- Apogonia cupreicollis Blanchard, 1851
- Apogonia cupreomicans Moser, 1913
- Apogonia cupreoviridis Kolbe, 1886
- Apogonia cuprescens Blanchard, 1851
- Apogonia cuprina Moser, 1913
- Apogonia curtula (Péringuey, 1892)
- Apogonia curtulus (Fairmaire, 1887)
- Apogonia dalatensis Frey, 1971
- Apogonia dapitana Moser, 1921
- Apogonia decellei Lacroix, 2008
- Apogonia deformis Kobayashi, 2009
- Apogonia depressifrons Kobayashi, 2013
- Apogonia destructor Bos, 1890
- Apogonia detanii Kobayashi, 2021
- Apogonia difficilis Heller, 1897
- Apogonia dingi Kobayashi, 2019
- Apogonia diversicollis Moser, 1914
- Apogonia doisuthepana Kobayashi, 2008
- Apogonia duebayensis Kobayashi, 2014
- Apogonia dux Sharp, 1876
- Apogonia edentula Kobayashi, 2007
- Apogonia elongata Arrow, 1938
- Apogonia emineopygidialis Kobayashi, 2015
- Apogonia encausta Kolbe, 1899
- Apogonia endoi Kobayashi, 2009
- Apogonia eremita Heller, 1897
- Apogonia exasperata Kobayashi, 2014
- Apogonia excedens Kobayashi, 2013
- Apogonia expeditionis Ritsema, 1896
- Apogonia fallaciosa Kobayashi, 2014
- Apogonia farinosa Sharp, 1876
- Apogonia fatidica Kolbe, 1899
- Apogonia feai Moser, 1918
- Apogonia ferrugata Moser, 1917
- Apogonia ferruginea (Fabricius, 1781)
- Apogonia flavipennis Moser, 1913
- Apogonia flavipes Gestro, 1883
- Apogonia flavorufa Moser, 1913
- Apogonia flectclypea Kobayashi, 2012
- Apogonia floresiana Kobayashi, 2008
- Apogonia formosana Moser, 1913
- Apogonia foveolata Kobayashi, 2012
- Apogonia frontalis Heller, 1896
- Apogonia fujiokai Miyake & Yamaya, 1997
- Apogonia fukinukii Kobayashi, 2009
- Apogonia fulgida Sharp, 1881
- Apogonia fulgidicollis Moser, 1913
- Apogonia fulvipes Moser, 1913
- Apogonia fulvosetosa Arrow, 1916
- Apogonia fulvosquamosa Moser, 1913
- Apogonia fuscescens Moser, 1917
- Apogonia fuscolineata Kobayashi, 2009
- Apogonia fuscula Moser, 1921
- Apogonia gibbiventris Kobayashi, 2007
- Apogonia gigantea Nonfried, 1894
- Apogonia glabra Moser, 1913
- Apogonia glabricollis Heller, 1897
- Apogonia glabrifrons Frey, 1960
- Apogonia goedhuisi Ritsema, 1896
- Apogonia gracilipes Heller, 1897
- Apogonia gracilis Arrow, 1916
- Apogonia grandis Moser, 1913
- Apogonia granulosa Kobayashi, 2007
- Apogonia granum Burmeister, 1855
- Apogonia gressitti Frey, 1971
- Apogonia griseosquamosa Moser, 1924
- Apogonia hainanensis Kobayashi, 2019
- Apogonia haradai Kobayashi, 2022
- Apogonia haryanavi Mittal, 1988
- Apogonia helleri Ritsema, 1904
- Apogonia heptagona Lansberge, 1879
- Apogonia heterosquamulata Heller, 1897
- Apogonia heynei Moser, 1918
- Apogonia hilaris Arrow, 1938
- Apogonia hirta Moser, 1913
- Apogonia hirtella Burgeon, 1945
- Apogonia hisakoae Kobayashi, 2017
- Apogonia hongiaoensis Kobayashi & Lien, 2020
- Apogonia hongkongica Miyake, 1989
- Apogonia hopei Ritsema, 1897
- Apogonia ignorata Kobayashi, 2010
- Apogonia illiberalis Kobayashi, 2010
- Apogonia impressa Ritsema, 1898
- Apogonia impressifrons Moser, 1913
- Apogonia impressipyga Frey, 1962
- Apogonia improba Péringuey, 1904
- Apogonia imugana Moser, 1924
- Apogonia inconstans Kobayashi & Bezděk, 2011
- Apogonia indica Bos, 1890
- Apogonia inexspectata Kobayashi, 2010
- Apogonia insignis Brenske, 1893
- Apogonia insulana Karsch, 1882
- Apogonia insularis Moser, 1917
- Apogonia irianjayana Kobayashi, 2014
- Apogonia irrorata Arrow, 1938
- Apogonia ishiharai Sawada, 1940
- Apogonia itoi Kobayashi, 2009
- Apogonia jakli Kobayashi, 2017
- Apogonia jenisi Kobayashi, 2019
- Apogonia jeraiana Kobayashi, 2021
- Apogonia jinpingensis Kobayashi, 2016
- Apogonia jokoana Moser, 1917
- Apogonia kalimantana Kobayashi, 2012
- Apogonia kamerunica Moser, 1917
- Apogonia kamiyai Sawada, 1940
- Apogonia kanchanaburiana Kobayashi, 2020
- Apogonia katangensis Frey, 1960
- Apogonia katangtokensis Kobayashi, 2009
- Apogonia kedahensis Kobayashi, 2021
- Apogonia keralana Kobayashi, 2021
- Apogonia kilimana Kolbe, 1899
- Apogonia kmasumotoi Kobayashi, 2020
- Apogonia kolbei Heller, 1897
- Apogonia kombirana Brenske, 1896
- Apogonia kubani Bezděk & Kobayashi, 2011
- Apogonia kunenensis Lacroix, 2008
- Apogonia kusuii Kobayashi & Bezděk, 2011
- Apogonia kyulomensis Kobayashi, 2010
- Apogonia laeta Arrow, 1938
- Apogonia laevicarinata Kobayashi, 2013
- Apogonia laevicollis Lansberge, 1879
- Apogonia laeviscutata Moser, 1914
- Apogonia lamdongensis Kobayashi, 2010
- Apogonia lamottei Lacroix, 2008
- Apogonia lanata Frey, 1964
- Apogonia lankawiensis Kobayashi, 2021
- Apogonia laosana Moser, 1919
- Apogonia lasia Heller, 1896
- Apogonia lateralis Arrow, 1916
- Apogonia latescutellata Heller, 1897
- Apogonia laticeps Moser, 1913
- Apogonia latidentata Kobayashi, 2009
- Apogonia latitarsis Moser, 1924
- Apogonia latiuscula Kobayashi, 2013
- Apogonia lenis Kobayashi, 2012
- Apogonia lepidota Heller, 1896
- Apogonia leuweni Brenske, 1894
- Apogonia levia Kobayashi, 2019
- Apogonia leytensis Kobayashi, 2013
- Apogonia ligaoensis Kobayashi, 2013
- Apogonia lobata Ritsema, 1904
- Apogonia loi Kobayashi, 2007
- Apogonia loizeaui Ritsema, 1914
- Apogonia lombokiana Moser, 1913
- Apogonia longispina Kobayashi, 2010
- Apogonia lurida Karsch, 1882
- Apogonia lutea Moser, 1910
- Apogonia luzonica Moser, 1915
- Apogonia maculipennis Moser, 1924
- Apogonia magnifica Ritsema, 1897
- Apogonia major Waterhouse, 1875
- Apogonia malaccensis Moser, 1913
- Apogonia malangia Moser, 1913
- Apogonia mandaragonensis Kobayashi, 2013
- Apogonia mangalorensis Moser, 1919
- Apogonia marginata Heller, 1897
- Apogonia masatoshii Kobayashi & Bezděk, 2011
- Apogonia mashona Péringuey, 1904
- Apogonia masumotoi Kobayashi, 2015
- Apogonia matakakuwai Kobayashi, 2022
- Apogonia mathisoni Kobayashi & Bezděk, 2011
- Apogonia maynei Burgeon, 1945
- Apogonia meghalayana Kobayashi, 2021
- Apogonia menglaensis Kobayashi, 2019
- Apogonia metallescens Moser, 1910
- Apogonia metallica Blanchard, 1851
- Apogonia metasternalis Ritsema, 1896
- Apogonia mindanaoana Moser, 1915
- Apogonia mindanaoensis Kobayashi & Medina, 2024
- Apogonia minor Heller, 1896
- Apogonia minuta Dejean, 1836
- Apogonia minutissima Brenske, 1894
- Apogonia miyagawai Kobayashi & Lien, 2020
- Apogonia miyakei Bezděk, 2004
- Apogonia moesta Burmeister, 1855
- Apogonia mohagani Kobayashi, 2013
- Apogonia moluccana Moser, 1913
- Apogonia montana Moser, 1915
- Apogonia monticola Moser, 1915
- Apogonia montivaga Heller, 1897
- Apogonia motoensis Burgeon, 1945
- Apogonia munda Karsch, 1882
- Apogonia nagalandana Kobayashi, 2021
- Apogonia nana (Walker, 1859)
- Apogonia nangunheana Kobayashi, 2019
- Apogonia neglecta Brenske, 1894
- Apogonia negrosensis Kobayashi, 2013
- Apogonia niasana Moser, 1913
- Apogonia nicobarica Chandra, 1995
- Apogonia nietneri Kolbe, 1899
- Apogonia nigricans Hope, 1831
- Apogonia nigripennis Moser, 1924
- Apogonia nigroaenea Moser, 1915
- Apogonia nigrobrunnea Moser, 1910
- Apogonia nigrochalcea Kolbe, 1899
- Apogonia nimbaensis Lacroix, 2008
- Apogonia niponica Lewis, 1895
- Apogonia nishikawai Kobayashi, 2010
- Apogonia nitida Moser, 1913
- Apogonia nitidula Thomson, 1858
- Apogonia nobilis Arrow, 1938
- Apogonia nodosa Brenske, 1900
- Apogonia norioi Kobayashi, 2021
- Apogonia nudiventris Kobayashi & Lien, 2020
- Apogonia oberthuerii Ritsema, 1897
- Apogonia obscura Blanchard, 1851
- Apogonia obscuridentata Kobayashi, 2012
- Apogonia obsoleta Kobayashi, 2017
- Apogonia ochracea Moser, 1913
- Apogonia ohmomoi Miyake, 1989
- Apogonia okushimai Kobayashi & Bezděk, 2011
- Apogonia opaca Gestro, 1883
- Apogonia orbitalis Ritsema, 1897
- Apogonia ovaliformis Kobayashi & Bezděk, 2011
- Apogonia overlaeti Burgeon, 1945
- Apogonia oviformis Kobayashi, 2010
- Apogonia pacholatkoi Kobayashi, 2017
- Apogonia padangensis Moser, 1917
- Apogonia pahangensis Kobayashi, 2017
- Apogonia palawana Heller, 1896
- Apogonia pallescens Waterhouse, 1877
- Apogonia papua Lansberge, 1880
- Apogonia paracribricollis Kobayashi, 2015
- Apogonia paralaevicarinata Kobayashi, 2013
- Apogonia paralatidentata Kobayashi, 2022
- Apogonia paramaura Moser, 1913
- Apogonia paraovaliformis Kobayashi & Lien, 2021
- Apogonia pararufobrunnea Kobayashi, 2019
- Apogonia pararufofusca Kobayashi, 2019
- Apogonia parasimplex Kobayashi, 2017
- Apogonia parastrigosa Kobayashi, 2021
- Apogonia paraxanthosoma Kobayashi, 2022
- Apogonia pectoralis Moser, 1917
- Apogonia perdix Arrow, 1938
- Apogonia perifovea Kobayashi, 2020
- Apogonia persubtilis Kobayashi, 2019
- Apogonia phangngana Kobayashi, 2022
- Apogonia philippinica Moser, 1921
- Apogonia philochlaenioides Moser, 1924
- Apogonia pilifera Moser, 1913
- Apogonia pilosa Heller, 1896
- Apogonia pilosella Moser, 1918
- Apogonia pingtungensis Kobayashi, 2015
- Apogonia planifrons Karsch, 1882
- Apogonia polisana Moser, 1924
- Apogonia polita Waterhouse, 1877
- Apogonia posticalis Arrow, 1921
- Apogonia producta Arrow, 1938
- Apogonia prolixa Arrow, 1916
- Apogonia propinqua Kobayashi, 2015
- Apogonia protracta Kobayashi, 2015
- Apogonia proxima Waterhouse, 1877
- Apogonia pseudamaura Heller, 1897
- Apogonia pseudofloresiana Kobayashi, 2009
- Apogonia pseudofoveolata Kobayashi, 2012
- Apogonia pseudopapua Kobayashi, 2014
- Apogonia pseudorizali Kobayashi & Medina, 2024
- Apogonia pseudosinuosa Kobayashi, 2017
- Apogonia pulchra Heller, 1896
- Apogonia punctata Bos, 1890
- Apogonia purpurascens Ritsema, 1913
- Apogonia pygidialis Ritsema, 1896
- Apogonia qiuae Kobayashi, 2019
- Apogonia qiui Kobayashi, 2019
- Apogonia rakovici Bezděk, 2025
- Apogonia rauca (Fabricius, 1781)
- Apogonia reticula Frey, 1975
- Apogonia ritsemae Sharp, 1882
- Apogonia rizali Heller, 1897
- Apogonia robusta Kobayashi, 2013
- Apogonia rotundiceps Moser, 1919
- Apogonia rudepunctata Moser, 1924
- Apogonia rufa Kobayashi, 2009
- Apogonia rufoaenescens Fairmaire, 1893
- Apogonia rufobrunnea Moser, 1915
- Apogonia rufofusca Moser, 1916
- Apogonia rugae Kobayashi, 2012
- Apogonia rugicollis Moser, 1913
- Apogonia rugifrons Moser, 1913
- Apogonia rugipennis Moser, 1910
- Apogonia rugosa Lansberge, 1879
- Apogonia rugositas Kobayashi & Medina, 2024
- Apogonia rugulosa Moser, 1913
- Apogonia sabahensis Kobayashi, 2013
- Apogonia sakamakii Kobayashi, 2014
- Apogonia saleijana Heller, 1897
- Apogonia sandakana Moser, 1921
- Apogonia sanghira Oberthür, 1879
- Apogonia sapa Kobayashi & Bezděk, 2011
- Apogonia schereri Frey, 1962
- Apogonia schoutedeni Moser, 1917
- Apogonia scrobicollis Moser, 1915
- Apogonia scutellaris Sharp, 1881
- Apogonia selangorensis Kobayashi, 2021
- Apogonia senohi Kobayashi, 2008
- Apogonia sequens Frey, 1975
- Apogonia sericata Heller, 1896
- Apogonia sericea Gestro, 1883
- Apogonia setifera Moser, 1913
- Apogonia setosa Arrow, 1921
- Apogonia setosella Moser, 1913
- Apogonia setulosa Sharp, 1881
- Apogonia sextuberculata Kobayashi, 2007
- Apogonia sharpi Heller, 1896
- Apogonia shimomurai Kobayashi, 2017
- Apogonia siamensis Moser, 1915
- Apogonia siberutana Kobayashi, 2017
- Apogonia sibutensis Moser, 1917
- Apogonia simaoensis Kobayashi, 2020
- Apogonia simillima Kobayashi, 2009
- Apogonia simplex Sharp, 1881
- Apogonia simulans Moser, 1914
- Apogonia sinuata Kobayashi & Bezděk, 2011
- Apogonia sinuolata Kobayashi, 2015
- Apogonia sinuosa Kobayashi, 2017
- Apogonia sjoestedti Moser, 1921
- Apogonia solida (Walker, 1859)
- Apogonia solorensis Moser, 1913
- Apogonia sombooni Kobayashi, 2015
- Apogonia soror Heller, 1897
- Apogonia sossiana Kolbe, 1914
- Apogonia speculifera Ritsema, 1904
- Apogonia sphaerica Burmeister, 1855
- Apogonia splendida Boheman, 1858
- Apogonia splendidula Moser, 1919
- Apogonia squamelliformis Kobayashi, 2010
- Apogonia squamifera Moser, 1915
- Apogonia squamipennis Karsch, 1882
- Apogonia squamosetosa Moser, 1913
- Apogonia squamulosa Gestro, 1883
- Apogonia striatipennis Frey, 1971
- Apogonia strigosa Kobayashi, 2008
- Apogonia subaenea Kolbe, 1914
- Apogonia subpilosula Heller, 1897
- Apogonia subrugipennis Moser, 1917
- Apogonia subseriata Kolbe, 1899
- Apogonia subvittata Heller, 1896
- Apogonia sulcata Kolbe, 1899
- Apogonia sulcaticeps Ritsema, 1898
- Apogonia sumbawana Moser, 1913
- Apogonia surigaoana Moser, 1924
- Apogonia suzukii Kobayashi, 2017
- Apogonia taibaiensis Kobayashi, 2020
- Apogonia taiwana Kobayashi, 2007
- Apogonia takahashii Kobayashi, 2015
- Apogonia takakuwai Kobayashi, 2010
- Apogonia takasagoensis Sawada, 1940
- Apogonia tamdaoensis Kobayashi, 2008
- Apogonia tangana Moser, 1917
- Apogonia tangcolana Moser, 1924
- Apogonia tanigawaensis Sawada, 1940
- Apogonia tenuipes Moser, 1915
- Apogonia terminalis Miyake, Yamaguchi & Akiyama, 2002
- Apogonia teruakii Kobayashi, 2010
- Apogonia tessellata Arrow, 1938
- Apogonia tibetana Kobayashi, 2019
- Apogonia timorensis Moser, 1913
- Apogonia tomeensis Lacroix, 2008
- Apogonia tortuosa Kobayashi, 2017
- Apogonia toshioi Kobayashi & Bezděk, 2011
- Apogonia toxopei Moser, 1926
- Apogonia transvaalensis Lacroix, 2008
- Apogonia tridentata Kolbe, 1899
- Apogonia truncata Frey, 1969
- Apogonia truncaticeps Moser, 1913
- Apogonia tsutsumiuchii Kobayashi, 2023
- Apogonia tuberculifrons Moser, 1926
- Apogonia tuberculiventris Ritsema, 1897
- Apogonia tumai Kobayashi, 2016
- Apogonia uelleana Brenske, 1899
- Apogonia uhligi Lacroix, 2008
- Apogonia unidens Frey, 1962
- Apogonia unidentata Miyake, Yamaguchi & Akiyama, 2002
- Apogonia variabilis Kobayashi, 2009
- Apogonia varians Ritsema, 1897
- Apogonia varievestis Heller, 1897
- Apogonia variiceps Moser, 1913
- Apogonia vastatrix Heller, 1897
- Apogonia ventralis Moser, 1913
- Apogonia vestita Sharp, 1876
- Apogonia vethi Moser, 1914
- Apogonia vicina Burmeister, 1855
- Apogonia vietnamensis Kobayashi & Bezděk, 2011
- Apogonia villigera Moser, 1919
- Apogonia villosella Blanchard, 1851
- Apogonia villosula Moser, 1919
- Apogonia vinhphuensis Kobayashi & Lien, 2021
- Apogonia virescens Duvivier, 1891
- Apogonia viridana Moser, 1910
- Apogonia viridifulva Heller, 1897
- Apogonia viridimicans Moser, 1916
- Apogonia viridipennis Gestro, 1883
- Apogonia vossi Frey, 1964
- Apogonia waigeana Arrow, 1941
- Apogonia wakaharai Kobayashi, 2010
- Apogonia watanabei Kobayashi, 2010
- Apogonia waterhousei Ritsema, 1896
- Apogonia waterstradti Ritsema, 1904
- Apogonia werneri Lacroix, 2008
- Apogonia wittkugeli (Nonfried, 1894)
- Apogonia wittmeri Frey, 1975
- Apogonia xanthosoma Kobayashi, 2009
- Apogonia xiengkhouangana Kobayashi, 2010
- Apogonia xui Kobayashi, 2019
- Apogonia xuorum Kobayashi, 2016
- Apogonia yunnana Moser, 1915
- Apogonia yunnanensis Kobayashi, 2019
