= Apogonia congoensis =

Scientific classification
- Kingdom: Animalia
- Phylum: Arthropoda
- Clade: Pancrustacea
- Class: Insecta
- Order: Coleoptera
- Suborder: Polyphaga
- Infraorder: Scarabaeiformia
- Family: Scarabaeidae
- Genus: Apogonia
- Species: A. congoensis

Binomial name
- Apogonia congoensis Moser, 1918

Species of beetle

Apogonia congoensis is a species of beetle of the family Scarabaeidae. It is found in the Democratic Republic of the Congo.

== Description ==
Adults reach a length of about 8 mm. They are brown, with a faint metallic sheen. The punctures on the frons are irregular, while those on the broadly rounded clypeus are dense. The antennae are yellowish-brown. The pronotum is moderately densely covered with rather coarse punctures, while the punctation on elytra is smooth. The underside is widely punctate in the middle and more densely punctate at the sides. The punctures are covered with light-coloured setae.
