= Apogonia aeneocuprea =

Scientific classification
- Kingdom: Animalia
- Phylum: Arthropoda
- Clade: Pancrustacea
- Class: Insecta
- Order: Coleoptera
- Suborder: Polyphaga
- Infraorder: Scarabaeiformia
- Family: Scarabaeidae
- Genus: Apogonia
- Species: A. aeneocuprea

Binomial name
- Apogonia aeneocuprea Moser, 1915

Species of beetle

Apogonia aeneocuprea is a species of beetle of the family Scarabaeidae. It is found in Indonesia (Nias).

== Description ==
Adults reach a length of about 9 mm. The top is ore-coloured with a coppery sheen, while the underside is metallic black, with a faintly green and coppery-shimmering. The legs are coppery-brown. The frons is quite sparsely punctate, especially in the anterior part. The pronotum is strongly punctured. The scutellum has a few very faint punctures.
