= Apogonia badia =

Scientific classification
- Kingdom: Animalia
- Phylum: Arthropoda
- Clade: Pancrustacea
- Class: Insecta
- Order: Coleoptera
- Suborder: Polyphaga
- Infraorder: Scarabaeiformia
- Family: Scarabaeidae
- Genus: Apogonia
- Species: A. badia

Binomial name
- Apogonia badia Moser, 1915

Species of beetle

Apogonia badia is a species of beetle of the family Scarabaeidae. It is found in Indonesia (Timor).

== Description ==
Adults reach a length of about 12 mm. They have the same shape and colouration as Apogonia castanea. The head is coarsely and quite densely punctate and the antennae are reddish. The pronotum is shaped like that of A. castanea, but the punctures on it are much finer. The scutellum is smooth. On the elytra, the punctures, in contrast to A. castanea, are very faint and are spaced approximately at the same intervals as on the pronotum.
