= Apogonia aerata =

Scientific classification
- Kingdom: Animalia
- Phylum: Arthropoda
- Clade: Pancrustacea
- Class: Insecta
- Order: Coleoptera
- Suborder: Polyphaga
- Infraorder: Scarabaeiformia
- Family: Scarabaeidae
- Genus: Apogonia
- Species: A. aerata

Binomial name
- Apogonia aerata Moser, 1916

Synonyms
- Apogonia convexicollis Frey, 1962

Species of beetle

Apogonia aerata is a species of beetle in the family Scarabaeidae. It is found in India (Assam, Bihar, Meghalaya).

== Description ==
Adults reach a length of about 10 mm. They are black, with an ore-like sheen, sometimes also with a faint coppery sheen. The head and pronotum are quite densely punctured. The punctures of the pronotum have mostly minute setae. The scutellum is smooth or has a few fine punctures. The similarly minutely setate punctures of the elytra are coarser than those on the pronotum.
