= Apogonia viridimicans =

Scientific classification
- Kingdom: Animalia
- Phylum: Arthropoda
- Clade: Pancrustacea
- Class: Insecta
- Order: Coleoptera
- Suborder: Polyphaga
- Infraorder: Scarabaeiformia
- Family: Scarabaeidae
- Genus: Apogonia
- Species: A. viridimicans

Binomial name
- Apogonia viridimicans Moser, 1916

Species of beetle

Apogonia viridimicans is a species of beetle of the family Scarabaeidae. It is found in the Philippines (Luzon).

== Description ==
Adults reach a length of about 5–6 mm. They are brown and shiny, with a greenish sheen on the upper surface. The head is densely punctate, the suture is indistinct in the middle, and the frons is narrowly smooth here. The pronotum is fairly densely punctured and the scutellum only has a few punctures. The elytra are densely covered with coarse punctures. The ribs, with only a few fine punctures, are very weakly convex.
