= Apogonia basalis =

Scientific classification
- Kingdom: Animalia
- Phylum: Arthropoda
- Clade: Pancrustacea
- Class: Insecta
- Order: Coleoptera
- Suborder: Polyphaga
- Infraorder: Scarabaeiformia
- Family: Scarabaeidae
- Genus: Apogonia
- Species: A. basalis

Binomial name
- Apogonia basalis Moser, 1915

Species of beetle

Apogonia basalis is a species of beetle of the family Scarabaeidae. It is found in China (Fujian).

== Description ==
Adults reach a length of about 13 mm. They are reddish-brown with a faint metallic sheen. The head, pronotum, scutellum and thorax are black. The head is densely punctate and the antennae are yellowish-brown. The pronotum is densely covered with arcuate punctures. The scutellum is also quite densely punctate. The elytra are weakly wrinkled and coarsely, but not particularly densely, punctate. Only the base of the elytra has weaker and equally dense punctation as the pronotum. The ribs of the elytra are only indistinctly visible.
