= Apogonia katangensis =

Scientific classification
- Kingdom: Animalia
- Phylum: Arthropoda
- Clade: Pancrustacea
- Class: Insecta
- Order: Coleoptera
- Suborder: Polyphaga
- Infraorder: Scarabaeiformia
- Family: Scarabaeidae
- Genus: Apogonia
- Species: A. katangensis

Binomial name
- Apogonia katangensis Frey, 1960

Species of beetle

Apogonia katangensis is a species of beetle of the family Scarabaeidae. It is found in the Democratic Republic of the Congo.

== Description ==
Adults reach a length of about 6.5–7 mm. The upper and lower surfaces are reddish-brown and shiny. The upper surface is smooth, while there are very short setae on the underside. The top of the head is densely punctured and the pronotum is rather densely and uniformly coarsely punctate. The elytra are punctate like the pronotum, but with three smooth, slightly prominent, completely flat ribs.
