= Apogonia pacholatkoi =

Scientific classification
- Kingdom: Animalia
- Phylum: Arthropoda
- Clade: Pancrustacea
- Class: Insecta
- Order: Coleoptera
- Suborder: Polyphaga
- Infraorder: Scarabaeiformia
- Family: Scarabaeidae
- Genus: Apogonia
- Species: A. pacholatkoi

Binomial name
- Apogonia pacholatkoi Kobayashi, 2017

Species of beetle

Apogonia pacholatkoi is a species of beetle of the family Scarabaeidae. It is found in Vietnam.

== Description ==
Adults reach a length of about 9–11.5 mm. They have an elongate oval, rather convex body. The body is chestnut brown, but the head is dark brown and the antennae are yellowish brown. The dorsal and ventral surface are dull shining. The dorsal surface is glabrous, while the ventral surface is sparsely covered with fine and short hairs.

== Etymology ==
The species is dedicated to the Czech scarabaeidologist Petr Pacholátko who collected the type specimens.
