= Apogonia ferrugata =

Scientific classification
- Kingdom: Animalia
- Phylum: Arthropoda
- Clade: Pancrustacea
- Class: Insecta
- Order: Coleoptera
- Suborder: Polyphaga
- Infraorder: Scarabaeiformia
- Family: Scarabaeidae
- Genus: Apogonia
- Species: A. ferrugata

Binomial name
- Apogonia ferrugata Moser, 1917

Species of beetle

Apogonia ferrugata is a species of beetle of the family Scarabaeidae. It is found in the Central African Republic, Chad and the Democratic Republic of the Congo.

== Description ==
Adults reach a length of about 6-6.5 mm. They are yellowish-brown. The frons is densely punctured. The pronotum is covered with moderately dense, rather strong punctures. The elytra are strongly punctured, with the ribs smooth and bordered by deep rows of punctures. The underside has only a few punctures in the middle, but is widely punctured at the sides. The punctures are covered with pale setae.
