= Apogonia tenuipes =

Scientific classification
- Kingdom: Animalia
- Phylum: Arthropoda
- Clade: Pancrustacea
- Class: Insecta
- Order: Coleoptera
- Suborder: Polyphaga
- Infraorder: Scarabaeiformia
- Family: Scarabaeidae
- Genus: Apogonia
- Species: A. tenuipes

Binomial name
- Apogonia tenuipes Moser, 1915

Species of beetle

Apogonia tenuipes is a species of beetle of the family Scarabaeidae. It is found in Myanmar.

== Description ==
Adults reach a length of about 7 mm. They are reddish-brown, the head and pronotum with a faint green metallic sheen. The head is densely punctate and the antennae are brown. The pronotum is moderately densely punctured is in the middle and more densely punctured at the sides. The punctures are a little stronger than those on the frons. The scutellum is extensively covered with punctures. The elytra are strongly punctured, the punctures with tiny setae. The first dorsal rib is narrow anteriorly and slightly widened posteriorly, while the second dorsal rib is uniformly narrow along its entire length. Because the rows of punctures surrounding the ribs are deep, the ribs appear weakly convex. They are somewhat less densely punctured than the interstices.
