= Apogonia rugositas =

Scientific classification
- Kingdom: Animalia
- Phylum: Arthropoda
- Clade: Pancrustacea
- Class: Insecta
- Order: Coleoptera
- Suborder: Polyphaga
- Infraorder: Scarabaeiformia
- Family: Scarabaeidae
- Genus: Apogonia
- Species: A. rugositas

Binomial name
- Apogonia rugositas Kobayashi & Medina, 2024

Species of beetle

Apogonia rugositas is a species of beetle of the family Scarabaeidae. It is found in the Philippines (Mindanao).

== Description ==
Adults reach a length of about 14-14.5 mm. They have an elongate-oval, gently convex body. The dorsal and ventral surfaces are black, sometimes with the antennae reddish brown and the legs slightly reddish brown. The dorsum is moderately shiny and glabrous, but most of the punctures on the elytra have tiny, fine hairs. The venter surface is somewhat strongly shiny and sparsely covered with minute or short hairs.

== Etymology ==
The species is named after the wrinkle-like puncture on its dorsum.
