= Apogonia jokoana =

Scientific classification
- Kingdom: Animalia
- Phylum: Arthropoda
- Clade: Pancrustacea
- Class: Insecta
- Order: Coleoptera
- Suborder: Polyphaga
- Infraorder: Scarabaeiformia
- Family: Scarabaeidae
- Genus: Apogonia
- Species: A. jokoana

Binomial name
- Apogonia jokoana Moser, 1917

Species of beetle

Apogonia jokoana is a species of beetle of the family Scarabaeidae. It is found in Cameroon.

== Description ==
Adults reach a length of about 7–8 mm. They are yellowish-brown and shiny. The head is densely punctate. The pronotum is quite densely and strongly punctate and the elytra are covered with strong punctures, with narrow, smooth ribs. The underside is sparsely punctate in the middle, becoming more closely punctate at the sides. The punctures are covered with white setae.
