= Apogonia simulans =

Scientific classification
- Kingdom: Animalia
- Phylum: Arthropoda
- Clade: Pancrustacea
- Class: Insecta
- Order: Coleoptera
- Suborder: Polyphaga
- Infraorder: Scarabaeiformia
- Family: Scarabaeidae
- Genus: Apogonia
- Species: A. simulans

Binomial name
- Apogonia simulans Moser, 1914

Species of beetle

Apogonia simulans is a species of beetle of the family Scarabaeidae. It is found in Indonesia (Simeulue).

== Description ==
Adults reach a length of about 11 mm. They are coloured similarly to Apogonia simplex and of similar shape, but somewhat larger. The frons is coarsely punctate. The shape and sculpture of the pronotum are similar to those of A. simplex and the scutellum is almost smooth, with only traces of punctures visible. The sculpture of the elytra is somewhat stronger than in A. simplex.
