= Apogonia rufofusca =

Scientific classification
- Kingdom: Animalia
- Phylum: Arthropoda
- Clade: Pancrustacea
- Class: Insecta
- Order: Coleoptera
- Suborder: Polyphaga
- Infraorder: Scarabaeiformia
- Family: Scarabaeidae
- Genus: Apogonia
- Species: A. rufofusca

Binomial name
- Apogonia rufofusca Moser, 1916

Species of beetle

Apogonia rufofusca is a species of beetle of the family Scarabaeidae. It is found in China (Hong Kong).

== Description ==
Adults reach a length of about 7–8 mm. They are reddish-brown and shiny. The head is densely punctate. The pronotum is very slightly wrinkled and quite densely covered with punctures, becoming more closely spaced laterally. The scutellum has only a few fine punctures. The elytra are weakly wrinkled and coarsely punctate. The narrow ribs are slightly convex and almost without punctures.
