= Apogonia bakeri =

Scientific classification
- Kingdom: Animalia
- Phylum: Arthropoda
- Clade: Pancrustacea
- Class: Insecta
- Order: Coleoptera
- Suborder: Polyphaga
- Infraorder: Scarabaeiformia
- Family: Scarabaeidae
- Genus: Apogonia
- Species: A. bakeri

Binomial name
- Apogonia bakeri Moser, 1915

Species of beetle

Apogonia bakeri is a species of beetle of the family Scarabaeidae. It is found in the Philippines (Luzon).

== Description ==
Adults reach a length of about 8 mm. They are entirely black with an ore-like sheen, or coppery-brown with a darker head and pronotum. The head is moderately densely covered with rather strong punctures and the antennae are reddish-yellow. The pronotum has strong punctures, the scutellum is unpunctate and the punctures of the elytra are somewhat coarser than those of the pronotum. The ribs, indented by rows of punctures, are smooth and narrow.
