= Apogonia calcuttana =

Scientific classification
- Kingdom: Animalia
- Phylum: Arthropoda
- Clade: Pancrustacea
- Class: Insecta
- Order: Coleoptera
- Suborder: Polyphaga
- Infraorder: Scarabaeiformia
- Family: Scarabaeidae
- Genus: Apogonia
- Species: A. calcuttana

Binomial name
- Apogonia calcuttana Moser, 1916

Species of beetle

Apogonia calcuttana is a species of beetle of the family Scarabaeidae. It is found in India (West Bengal).

== Description ==
Adults reach a length of about 7 mm. They are black with a slight ore-coloured sheen. The head is moderately densely punctured. On the pronotum, the punctures are somewhat more widely spaced than on the head and the scutellum is almost unpunctate. The elytra are very slightly wrinkled and rather closely and coarsely punctured. The ribs are very narrow and unpunctate.
