= Apogonia pilosella =

Scientific classification
- Kingdom: Animalia
- Phylum: Arthropoda
- Clade: Pancrustacea
- Class: Insecta
- Order: Coleoptera
- Suborder: Polyphaga
- Infraorder: Scarabaeiformia
- Family: Scarabaeidae
- Genus: Apogonia
- Species: A. pilosella

Binomial name
- Apogonia pilosella Moser, 1918

Species of beetle

Apogonia pilosella is a species of beetle of the family Scarabaeidae. It is found in India (Karnataka).

== Description ==
Adults reach a length of about 6.5–7 mm. The colour and shape is similar to Apogonia konbirana, but otherwise both species are very different. It may be distinguished by the fact that on the upper surface each puncture has a short, erect, yellowish-grey hair. The head is moderately densely punctured and the antennae are yellowish-brown. The pronotum is moderately densely and rather strongly punctured and the elytra are coarsely punctured, with narrow and unpunctate ribs. The underside is quite widely punctured in the middle and more densely punctured at the sides. The punctures have yellowish-grey hairs.
