= Apogonia blanchardi =

Scientific classification
- Kingdom: Animalia
- Phylum: Arthropoda
- Clade: Pancrustacea
- Class: Insecta
- Order: Coleoptera
- Suborder: Polyphaga
- Infraorder: Scarabaeiformia
- Family: Scarabaeidae
- Genus: Apogonia
- Species: A. blanchardi

Binomial name
- Apogonia blanchardi Ritsema, 1898

Species of beetle

Apogonia blanchardi, is a species of dung beetle found in India and Sri Lanka.

== Description ==
The species is characterized by strongly convex pronotum which is covered in very sparse and fine punctures.

Larval stage is considered as a serious pest of cocoa, where they feed on the cocoa leaf from the peripheral region. The female lays eggs in top few centimeters of soil, such as in pastures and near the host plants where the adults feed on. It is also found in Hibiscus plants.
