= Apogonia monticola =

Scientific classification
- Kingdom: Animalia
- Phylum: Arthropoda
- Clade: Pancrustacea
- Class: Insecta
- Order: Coleoptera
- Suborder: Polyphaga
- Infraorder: Scarabaeiformia
- Family: Scarabaeidae
- Genus: Apogonia
- Species: A. monticola

Binomial name
- Apogonia monticola Moser, 1915

Species of beetle

Apogonia monticola is a species of beetle of the family Scarabaeidae. It is found in the Philippines (Luzon).

== Description ==
Adults reach a length of about 6.5 mm (0.26 in). They are similar to Apogonia viridana, but easily distinguished by its three-toothed protibiae. They are black with a bronze-coloured sheen. The head, pronotum, and scutellum, as well as the suture of the elytra, have a faint coppery sheen. The head bears rather large but flat semicircular punctures and the suture is indistinct. The clypeus is flatly rounded. The antennae are brown. The pronotum is twice as wide as it is long, somewhat arched in the middle, the posterior angles are obtuse and the anterior angles are weakly projecting and almost right-angled. The surface is quite extensively covered with strong punctures in the middle, becoming somewhat more densely covered with strong punctures towards the sides. The scutellum is unpunctate. The elytra are moderately densely and strongly punctured. The ribs, enclosed by rows of punctures, are narrow and smooth. On the pygidium, the coarse spots are quite widely spaced and in the posterior half of the pygidium, they bear fine hairs. The center of the thorax is almost smooth, the sides of the thorax are extensively covered with umbilical spots. The individual abdominal segments bear a row of spots along the anterior margin and another in front of the posterior margin. Along the sides of the segments, the posterior row of spots doubles. All spots bear pale setae. The sides of the abdomen are fringed along their entire length.
