= Apogonia reticula =

Scientific classification
- Kingdom: Animalia
- Phylum: Arthropoda
- Clade: Pancrustacea
- Class: Insecta
- Order: Coleoptera
- Suborder: Polyphaga
- Infraorder: Scarabaeiformia
- Family: Scarabaeidae
- Genus: Apogonia
- Species: A. reticula

Binomial name
- Apogonia reticula Frey, 1975

Species of beetle

Apogonia reticula is a species of beetle of the family Scarabaeidae. It is found in Indonesia (Sumatra).

== Description ==
Adults reach a length of about 9 mm. The upper and lower surfaces are blackish-brown. The pronotum is densely, but somewhat finely punctured, with the lines forming the net and enclosing the punctures being more vertically oriented. The elytra show a network of flat, tomentose punctures. The underside is entirely covered with flat, tomentose, coarse punctures.
