= Apogonia squamifera =

Scientific classification
- Kingdom: Animalia
- Phylum: Arthropoda
- Clade: Pancrustacea
- Class: Insecta
- Order: Coleoptera
- Suborder: Polyphaga
- Infraorder: Scarabaeiformia
- Family: Scarabaeidae
- Genus: Apogonia
- Species: A. squamifera

Binomial name
- Apogonia squamifera Moser, 1915

Species of beetle

Apogonia squamifera is a species of beetle of the family Scarabaeidae. It is found in the Philippines.

== Description ==
Adults reach a length of about 14 mm. They are reddish-brown and densely covered with grey scales or setae. The head is strongly setate and the antennae are reddish. The pronotum is densely punctate and, like the scutellum, densely covered with somewhat erect, strong setae. On the pronotum, a median line is marked in the anterior part by the fact that the setae are turned somewhat towards the side. The elytra are very densely covered with needle-like cracks, which have elongated scales that become bristle-like at the base and before the posterior margin of the elytra.
