= Apogonia rufobrunnea =

Scientific classification
- Kingdom: Animalia
- Phylum: Arthropoda
- Clade: Pancrustacea
- Class: Insecta
- Order: Coleoptera
- Suborder: Polyphaga
- Infraorder: Scarabaeiformia
- Family: Scarabaeidae
- Genus: Apogonia
- Species: A. rufobrunnea

Binomial name
- Apogonia rufobrunnea Moser, 1915

Species of beetle

Apogonia rufobrunnea is a species of beetle of the family Scarabaeidae. It is found in China (Fujian, Hainan) and Taiwan.

== Description ==
Adults reach a length of about 6–7 mm. They are reddish-brown. The scutellum has some scattered punctures and on the elytra, the punctures are quite strong. Furthermore, there are distinct narrow, smooth ridges.
