= Apogonia cupreoviridis =

Scientific classification
- Kingdom: Animalia
- Phylum: Arthropoda
- Clade: Pancrustacea
- Class: Insecta
- Order: Coleoptera
- Suborder: Polyphaga
- Infraorder: Scarabaeiformia
- Family: Scarabaeidae
- Genus: Apogonia
- Species: A. cupreoviridis

Binomial name
- Apogonia cupreoviridis Kolbe, 1886

Synonyms
- Apogonia bicarinata miyakona Nomura, 1965; Apogonia cupreoviridis fusana Kolbe, 1886; Apogonia nigroolivacea Heyden, 1886

Species of beetle

Apogonia cupreoviridis is a species of beetle of the family Scarabaeidae. It is found in China (Guizhou, Liaoning, Shaanxi, Shanxi, Zhejiang), Japan, Korea and the Russian Far East.

== Description ==
Adults reach a length of about 8–11 mm. They have an ovate, convex body. The surface is black or sometimes brownish-black, with a metallic green or cupreous shine. The antennae are chestnut brown. The head, pronotum and elytra are covered with very short setae, while the setae on the Legs and ventral surface are clearly visible.
