= Apogonia improba =

Scientific classification
- Kingdom: Animalia
- Phylum: Arthropoda
- Clade: Pancrustacea
- Class: Insecta
- Order: Coleoptera
- Suborder: Polyphaga
- Infraorder: Scarabaeiformia
- Family: Scarabaeidae
- Genus: Apogonia
- Species: A. improba

Binomial name
- Apogonia improba Péringuey, 1904

Species of beetle

Apogonia improba is a species of beetle of the family Scarabaeidae. It is found in Zimbabwe.

== Description ==
Adults reach a length of about 9.2 mm (0.36 in). They have the same size and shape as Apogonia curtula, but are dark bronze and very shiny. The shape and sculpture are the same, but the punctures on the elytra are somewhat finer, and the intervals quite smooth.
