= Apogonia bicarinata =

Scientific classification
- Kingdom: Animalia
- Phylum: Arthropoda
- Clade: Pancrustacea
- Class: Insecta
- Order: Coleoptera
- Suborder: Polyphaga
- Infraorder: Scarabaeiformia
- Family: Scarabaeidae
- Genus: Apogonia
- Species: A. bicarinata

Binomial name
- Apogonia bicarinata Lewis, 1896

Synonyms
- Apogonia bicarinata yaeyamana Nomura, 1965; Apogonia bicarinata okinawana Nomura, 1964; Apogonia sauteri Moser, 1918

Species of beetle

Apogonia bicarinata is a species of beetle of the family Scarabaeidae. It is found in Japan and Taiwan.

== Description ==
Adults reach a length of about 9–10 mm. They are black with an ornate sheen. The head is quite densely punctured and the antennae are reddish-yellow. The pronotum is moderately densely covered with rather strong punctures and the elytra are strongly punctured. The underside is sparsely punctured in the middle and rather densely punctured at the sides. The punctures have small, pale setae.
