= Apogonia colini =

Scientific classification
- Kingdom: Animalia
- Phylum: Arthropoda
- Clade: Pancrustacea
- Class: Insecta
- Order: Coleoptera
- Suborder: Polyphaga
- Infraorder: Scarabaeiformia
- Family: Scarabaeidae
- Genus: Apogonia
- Species: A. colini

Binomial name
- Apogonia colini Moser, 1917

Species of beetle

Apogonia colini is a species of beetle of the family Scarabaeidae. It is found in Cameroon and Gabon.

== Description ==
Adults reach a length of about 8–10 mm. They are bronze-coloured, with a green and coppery sheen. The head is densely punctured and the antennae are reddish-yellow. The pronotum is densely covered with rather strong punctures and the elytra are coarsely punctate. The ribs are flat and almost unpunctate. The underside is widely punctate in the middle, becoming more densely punctate laterally. The punctures are covered with whitish scale-like setae.
