= Apogonia aenea =

Scientific classification
- Kingdom: Animalia
- Phylum: Arthropoda
- Clade: Pancrustacea
- Class: Insecta
- Order: Coleoptera
- Suborder: Polyphaga
- Infraorder: Scarabaeiformia
- Family: Scarabaeidae
- Genus: Apogonia
- Species: A. aenea

Binomial name
- Apogonia aenea Moser, 1917

Species of beetle

Apogonia aenea is a species of beetle of the family Scarabaeidae. It is found in the Central African Republic, the Democratic Republic of the Congo and Zambia.

== Description ==
Adults reach a length of about 9.5 mm. They are ore-coloured and shiny, with a faint green and coppery sheen. The frons is moderately densely punctured. On the pronotum, the punctures are slightly more widely spaced than on the frons. The elytra are rather densely and strongly punctured, the ribs with scattered punctures. They are indented by rows of closely spaced punctures. The underside is very widely punctured in the middle and moderately densely punctured at the sides. The punctures have very small, light, bristle-like scales.
