= Apogonia convexa =

Scientific classification
- Kingdom: Animalia
- Phylum: Arthropoda
- Clade: Pancrustacea
- Class: Insecta
- Order: Coleoptera
- Suborder: Polyphaga
- Infraorder: Scarabaeiformia
- Family: Scarabaeidae
- Genus: Apogonia
- Species: A. convexa

Binomial name
- Apogonia convexa Moser, 1917

Species of beetle

Apogonia convexa is a species of beetle of the family Scarabaeidae. It is found in the Central African Republic.

== Description ==
Adults reach a length of about 7.5 mm. They are black and shiny, with reddish-brown antennae. The head is rather densely punctate. The pronotum is moderately densely punctate, with the punctures becoming denser towards the sides. The elytra have strong punctures, and the flat ribs are only marked by the surrounding rows of punctures. The underside is widely punctured in the middle, becoming more densely punctured laterally, with the punctures bearing pale setae.
