= Apogonia glabrifrons =

Scientific classification
- Kingdom: Animalia
- Phylum: Arthropoda
- Clade: Pancrustacea
- Class: Insecta
- Order: Coleoptera
- Suborder: Polyphaga
- Infraorder: Scarabaeiformia
- Family: Scarabaeidae
- Genus: Apogonia
- Species: A. glabrifrons

Binomial name
- Apogonia glabrifrons Frey, 1960

Species of beetle

Apogonia glabrifrons is a species of beetle of the family Scarabaeidae. It is found in India (Tamil Nadu).

== Description ==
Adults reach a length of about 7–8 mm. They are brown to blackish-brown and glossy. The upper surface is smooth, while the underside and pygidium have short and very sparse pubescence. The surface of the pronotum is irregularly and sparsely, quite finely, punctured. The underside of the elytra is sparsely and rather coarsely punctured.
