= Apogonia mindanaoensis =

Scientific classification
- Kingdom: Animalia
- Phylum: Arthropoda
- Clade: Pancrustacea
- Class: Insecta
- Order: Coleoptera
- Suborder: Polyphaga
- Infraorder: Scarabaeiformia
- Family: Scarabaeidae
- Genus: Apogonia
- Species: A. mindanaoensis

Binomial name
- Apogonia mindanaoensis Kobayashi & Medina, 2024

Species of beetle

Apogonia mindanaoensis is a species of beetle of the family Scarabaeidae. It is found in the Philippines (Mindanao).

== Description ==
Adults reach a length of about 12-12.5 mm. They have an oblong oval, gently convex body. The dorsal and ventral surfaces are black and the antennae are reddish brown. The dorsal surface is moderately shiny and glabrous, but most of the punctures on the elytra have tiny hairs. The ventral surface is somewhat strongly shining and sparsely covered with minute or short hairs.

== Etymology ==
The species is named after its type locality, Mindanao.
