= Apogonia fuscescens =

Scientific classification
- Kingdom: Animalia
- Phylum: Arthropoda
- Clade: Pancrustacea
- Class: Insecta
- Order: Coleoptera
- Suborder: Polyphaga
- Infraorder: Scarabaeiformia
- Family: Scarabaeidae
- Genus: Apogonia
- Species: A. fuscescens

Binomial name
- Apogonia fuscescens Moser, 1917

Species of beetle

Apogonia fuscescens is a species of beetle of the family Scarabaeidae. It is found in Kenya, the Democratic Republic of the Congo and Rwanda.

== Description ==
Adults reach a length of about 8–9 mm. They are blackish-brown (sometimes brown) and shiny, with a slightly bronze sheen. The frons is moderately densely punctate. The pronotum is rather robust and densely punctate. The elytra are strongly punctured and the ribs are smooth and indented with rows of closely spaced punctures. The underside is very sparsely punctate in the middle, while the punctures are more densely spaced at the sides. The spots have small, white setae.
