= Apogonia subrugipennis =

Scientific classification
- Kingdom: Animalia
- Phylum: Arthropoda
- Clade: Pancrustacea
- Class: Insecta
- Order: Coleoptera
- Suborder: Polyphaga
- Infraorder: Scarabaeiformia
- Family: Scarabaeidae
- Genus: Apogonia
- Species: A. subrugipennis

Binomial name
- Apogonia subrugipennis Moser, 1917

Species of beetle

Apogonia subrugipennis is a species of beetle of the family Scarabaeidae. It is found in Cameroon, the Democratic Republic of the Congo, Rwanda and Tanzania.

== Description ==
Adults reach a length of about 8 mm. They are black and shiny, with a slight bronze sheen. The frons is quite densely punctured. The pronotum is densely punctured in the middle, becoming more densely punctured towards the sides. The elytra are covered with strong punctures. The underside is rather sparsely punctured in the middle, becoming more densely punctured towards the sides. The punctures have pale setae.
