= Apogonia luzonica =

Scientific classification
- Kingdom: Animalia
- Phylum: Arthropoda
- Clade: Pancrustacea
- Class: Insecta
- Order: Coleoptera
- Suborder: Polyphaga
- Infraorder: Scarabaeiformia
- Family: Scarabaeidae
- Genus: Apogonia
- Species: A. luzonica

Binomial name
- Apogonia luzonica Moser, 1915

Species of beetle

Apogonia luzonica is a species of beetle of the family Scarabaeidae. It is found in the Philippines (Luzon).

== Description ==
Adults reach a length of about 7 mm (0.28 in). They are very similar in coloration and shape to Apogonia viridana, but differs in that the sides of the abdomen are not ridged as in the latter species. They are green and glossy, the underside has a brownish sheen, and the tarsi are brown. The head bears rather strong punctures, the suture is indistinct, and the clypeus has a slightly coppery sheen, the anterior margin is straight and truncate, and the anterior angles are rounded. The antennae are reddish-yellow. The pronotum is twice as wide as it is long at the base and arches widen in the middle. The surface is densely covered with strong punctures, which reveal tiny, pale setae along the lateral margins of the pronotum. The posterior angles of the pronotum are obtuse, and the projecting anterior angles are weakly acute. The scutellum is sparsely punctate and much smaller than in A. viridana. The elytra are covered with strong punctures between the suture and the first rib, which are somewhat more widely spaced than on the pronotum. Between the first rib and the lateral margin, the punctures are arranged in rows, with the punctures being more closely spaced in the rows bordering the flat ribs. The pygidium bears large umbilical punctures, which are covered with white scales in the anterior part of the pygidium and with erect grey hairs in the posterior part. The underside is rather sparsely punctate in the middle, but densely punctate towards the sides. The facets bear narrow white scales.
