= Apogonia brevicollis =

Scientific classification
- Kingdom: Animalia
- Phylum: Arthropoda
- Clade: Pancrustacea
- Class: Insecta
- Order: Coleoptera
- Suborder: Polyphaga
- Infraorder: Scarabaeiformia
- Family: Scarabaeidae
- Genus: Apogonia
- Species: A. brevicollis

Binomial name
- Apogonia brevicollis Moser, 1915

Species of beetle

Apogonia brevicollis is a species of beetle of the family Scarabaeidae. It is found in India (Tamil Nadu).

== Description ==
Adults reach a length of about 11 mm (0.43 in). They are similar in shape to Apogonia coriacea, but smaller and differently sculpted. It is black with a faint bronze sheen. The middle of the thorax, the femora, and the tarsi are reddish-brown. The head is strongly punctate, and the frons bears two flat, unpunctate tubercles behind the suture. The clypeus is short, its anterior margin is truncate, and the anterior angles are rounded. The antennae are brown. The pronotum is very short. It is sparsely punctate, its posterior angles are rounded, and the pointed anterior angles are somewhat projecting. The scutellum is either smooth or shows a few extremely fine punctures. The elytra are moderately densely and strongly punctate, and the ribs are narrow and unpunctate. The short-haired punctures on the pygidium are also moderately densely spaced. The underside is widely dotted in the middle, while towards the sides the dots are somewhat closer together and coarser. All dots bear short, light-coloured hairs.
