= Apogonia scrobicollis =

Scientific classification
- Kingdom: Animalia
- Phylum: Arthropoda
- Clade: Pancrustacea
- Class: Insecta
- Order: Coleoptera
- Suborder: Polyphaga
- Infraorder: Scarabaeiformia
- Family: Scarabaeidae
- Genus: Apogonia
- Species: A. scrobicollis

Binomial name
- Apogonia scrobicollis Moser, 1915

Species of beetle

Apogonia scrobicollis is a species of beetle of the family Scarabaeidae. It is found in Indonesia (Sumatra).

== Description ==
Adults reach a length of about 11 mm. They are black with a faint metallic sheen. They have quite large, pit-like punctures on the pronotum, with distinct setae in the punctures. The scutellum is punctate except in the center. The elytra have a moderately dense punctation. The punctures are short-bristled, and ridges are not discernible.
