= Apogonia niponica =

Scientific classification
- Kingdom: Animalia
- Phylum: Arthropoda
- Clade: Pancrustacea
- Class: Insecta
- Order: Coleoptera
- Suborder: Polyphaga
- Infraorder: Scarabaeiformia
- Family: Scarabaeidae
- Genus: Apogonia
- Species: A. niponica

Binomial name
- Apogonia niponica Lewis, 1895

Synonyms
- Apogonia chinensis Moser, 1918

Species of beetle

Apogonia niponica is a species of beetle of the family Scarabaeidae. It is found in China (Beijing, Guizhou, Hubei, Shaanxi, Sichuan), Japan and on the Korean Peninsula.

== Description ==
Adults reach a length of about 6.6–7.8 mm. They have a chestnut brown to brownish black, ovate body, with an indistinct metallic shine. The antennae are yellowish brown. The head, pronotum and discal part of the elytra are bare, while the lateral and apical parts of the elytra are covered with extremely short and barely visible setae. The legs and the ventral surface have short, pale setation.
