= Apogonia kamerunica =

Scientific classification
- Kingdom: Animalia
- Phylum: Arthropoda
- Clade: Pancrustacea
- Class: Insecta
- Order: Coleoptera
- Suborder: Polyphaga
- Infraorder: Scarabaeiformia
- Family: Scarabaeidae
- Genus: Apogonia
- Species: A. kamerunica

Binomial name
- Apogonia kamerunica Moser, 1917

Species of beetle

Apogonia kamerunica is a species of beetle of the family Scarabaeidae. It is found in Cameroon and the Central African Republic.

== Description ==
Adults reach a length of about 6.5–7 mm. They are brown or blackish-brown with a faint metallic sheen. The frons is moderately densely punctured. The pronotum is moderately densely covered with rather strong punctures. The elytra are strongly punctured, with the ribs smooth and bordered by rows of punctures. The underside is sparsely punctate in the middle, more densely punctate at the sides. The punctures are covered with light setae.
