= Apogonia montana =

Scientific classification
- Kingdom: Animalia
- Phylum: Arthropoda
- Clade: Pancrustacea
- Class: Insecta
- Order: Coleoptera
- Suborder: Polyphaga
- Infraorder: Scarabaeiformia
- Family: Scarabaeidae
- Genus: Apogonia
- Species: A. montana

Binomial name
- Apogonia montana Moser, 1915

Species of beetle

Apogonia montana is a species of beetle of the family Scarabaeidae. It is found in Malaysia (Sabah).

== Description ==
Adults reach a length of about 17 mm. They are reddish-brown and strongly shiny. The frons is quite densely covered with moderately strong punctures. The pronotum is quite densely, but extremely finely punctured. The scutellum is smooth. The elytra have widely spaced, very weak punctures, although they are a little more distinct than on the pronotum.
