= Apogonia schoutedeni =

Scientific classification
- Kingdom: Animalia
- Phylum: Arthropoda
- Clade: Pancrustacea
- Class: Insecta
- Order: Coleoptera
- Suborder: Polyphaga
- Infraorder: Scarabaeiformia
- Family: Scarabaeidae
- Genus: Apogonia
- Species: A. schoutedeni

Binomial name
- Apogonia schoutedeni Moser, 1917

Species of beetle

Apogonia schoutedeni is a species of beetle of the family Scarabaeidae. It is found in the Democratic Republic of the Congo.

== Description ==
Adults reach a length of about 8.5–9 mm. They are coppery or bronze-green and shiny. The antennae are yellowish-brown. The pronotum is moderately densely punctured and the punctures on the elytra are rather strong. The ribs are flat and covered with only a few punctures. They are indented by rows of punctures. The underside is sparsely and strongly punctate in the middle and rather densely and strongly punctate at the sides.
