= Apogonia rizali =

Scientific classification
- Kingdom: Animalia
- Phylum: Arthropoda
- Clade: Pancrustacea
- Class: Insecta
- Order: Coleoptera
- Suborder: Polyphaga
- Infraorder: Scarabaeiformia
- Family: Scarabaeidae
- Genus: Apogonia
- Species: A. rizali

Binomial name
- Apogonia rizali Heller, 1897

Species of beetle

Apogonia rizali is a species of beetle of the family Scarabaeidae. It is found in the Philippines (Mindanao).

== Description ==
Adults reach a length of about 11–13 mm. They have an elongate-oval, slightly convex body. The dorsal and ventral surfaces are black and the antennae are reddish brown. The dorsal surface is glabrous and moderately shiny, while the ventral surface is sparsely covered with minute or short hairs.
