= Apogonia subaenea =

Scientific classification
- Kingdom: Animalia
- Phylum: Arthropoda
- Clade: Pancrustacea
- Class: Insecta
- Order: Coleoptera
- Suborder: Polyphaga
- Infraorder: Scarabaeiformia
- Family: Scarabaeidae
- Genus: Apogonia
- Species: A. subaenea

Binomial name
- Apogonia subaenea Kolbe, 1914

Species of beetle

Apogonia subaenea is a species of beetle of the family Scarabaeidae. It is found in Burundi, the Democratic Republic of the Congo and Rwanda.

== Description ==
Adults reach a length of about 7–8 mm (0.28–0.31 in). They are similar to Apogonia contracta, but somewhat larger, much less metallic in colour, reddish-brown above and below (including the legs), with a greenish-metallic sheen. They are glabrous above, as is the underside of the body, but the punctures of the latter each contain a small, light bristle.
