= Apogonia borneensis =

Scientific classification
- Kingdom: Animalia
- Phylum: Arthropoda
- Clade: Pancrustacea
- Class: Insecta
- Order: Coleoptera
- Suborder: Polyphaga
- Infraorder: Scarabaeiformia
- Family: Scarabaeidae
- Genus: Apogonia
- Species: A. borneensis

Binomial name
- Apogonia borneensis Moser, 1915

Species of beetle

Apogonia borneensis is a species of beetle of the family Scarabaeidae. It is found in Brunei.

== Description ==
Adults reach a length of about 12 mm. They are shiny black, the elytra with a bronze-green or purple shimmer. The frons is rather sparsely punctate and very slightly flattened. The pronotum is moderately densely covered with fine punctures. The scutellum is almost smooth. The elytra are finely leathery and wrinkled, the punctures on them are not densely spaced, the ribs are only marked by the limiting rows of punctures and are punctate, as are the spaces between them. The punctures have extremely tiny setae.
