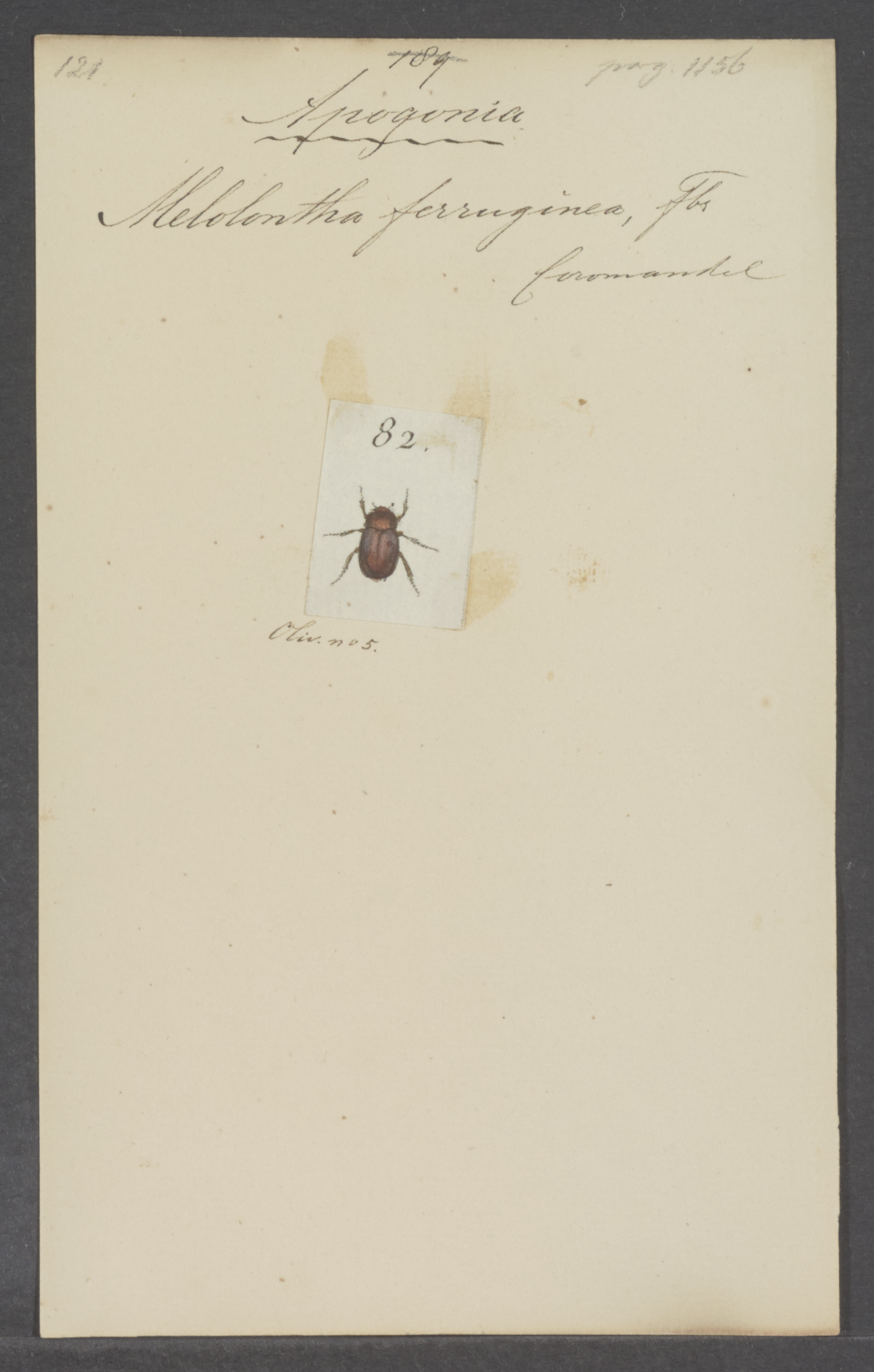
- Drawing of the Apogonia ferruginea beetle from the special collections of the University of Amsterdam.

Scientific classification
- Kingdom: Animalia
- Phylum: Arthropoda
- Clade: Pancrustacea
- Class: Insecta
- Order: Coleoptera
- Suborder: Polyphaga
- Infraorder: Scarabaeiformia
- Family: Scarabaeidae
- Genus: Apogonia
- Species: A. ferruginea

Binomial name
- Apogonia ferruginea (Fabricius, 1781)

Synonyms
- Melolontha ferruginea Fabricius, 1781; Apogonia anfracta Karsch, 1882; Apogonia uniformis Blanchard, 1851

= Apogonia ferruginea =

Species of beetle

Apogonia ferruginea, is a species of dung beetle found in India and Sri Lanka.

== Description ==
Length of the adult is about 5 to 9 mm. Body shiny ferruginous with a faint tint on forehead and thorax. Clypeus coarsely and closely punctured. Forehead with moderately strong punctures. Thorax obliquely narrowed in front with broadest at the middle. Elytra with strong punctures. Pygidium small but with similar puncturation as in thorax. Underside of the abdomen is pubescent.

In Rajasthan, the species is known to damage the leaves of pomegranate during June to July. Adults are active at night and easily attracted to light in large numbers. Adults are minor pests that feed on flowers, and leaves of rose, Acalypha, tamarind, cinnamon, avocado, Ixora and guava. Adults have been observed to emerge during the mid April to the mid August.
