= Apogonia curtula =

Scientific classification
- Kingdom: Animalia
- Phylum: Arthropoda
- Clade: Pancrustacea
- Class: Insecta
- Order: Coleoptera
- Suborder: Polyphaga
- Infraorder: Scarabaeiformia
- Family: Scarabaeidae
- Genus: Apogonia
- Species: A. curtula

Binomial name
- Apogonia curtula (Péringuey, 1892)

Synonyms
- Schizonycha curtula Péringuey, 1892

Species of beetle

Apogonia curtula is a species of beetle of the family Scarabaeidae. It is found in Namibia.

== Description ==
Adults reach a length of about 8.5–9.5 mm (0.33–0.37 in). They are testaceous-red, with a metallic sheen, and with the palpi and club of the antennae yellowish. The pronotum is covered with round, not contiguous punctures more closely set on the sides than on the disk, and slightly deeper in the male than in the female. The scutellum is finely punctate laterally and the elytra are plainly callose close to the humeral angle, slightly sinuate there, and then very slightly ampliated, moderately convex, and with two dorsal costules on each side, the suture is raised, and the intervals are filled with round punctures with smooth intervals nearly equal in width to the diameter of the punctures, the latter are seriate on the sides. The apical part of the propygidium and pygidium is deeply punctured and the abdomen is also deeply and closely punctured, each puncture with a minute, sub-flavescent hair. The legs are slightly hairy.
