= Schizonycha fulvipennis =

Scientific classification
- Kingdom: Animalia
- Phylum: Arthropoda
- Clade: Pancrustacea
- Class: Insecta
- Order: Coleoptera
- Suborder: Polyphaga
- Infraorder: Scarabaeiformia
- Family: Scarabaeidae
- Genus: Schizonycha
- Species: S. fulvipennis

Binomial name
- Schizonycha fulvipennis Moser, 1914

Species of beetle

Schizonycha fulvipennis is a species of beetle of the family Scarabaeidae. It is found in Ethiopia.

== Description ==
Adults reach a length of about 11 mm (0.43 in). They are similar to Schizonycha abdicta, but lighter in colour and the middle of the pronotum is almost smooth in the posterior half. The frons is transversely wrinkled, the clypeus bears strong punctures, its anterior margin is only very weakly emarginate. The pronotum is almost twice as wide as it is long, its punctures are somewhat rasp-like behind the anterior margin. The lateral margins are weakly crenate, the anterior and posterior angles are obtuse. The scutellum bears only a few setate punctures. On the elytra, the punctures bear white setae. The pygidium is quite extensively covered with erect setate umbilical punctures, which are hairy before the posterior margin. The chest, episterna, and hind coxae are quite densely punctured, the punctures bearing white, scale-like setae. The abdomen is moderately densely punctured. The punctures bear setae, becoming partially hairy towards the end of the abdomen.
