= Schizonycha squamulosa =

Scientific classification
- Kingdom: Animalia
- Phylum: Arthropoda
- Clade: Pancrustacea
- Class: Insecta
- Order: Coleoptera
- Suborder: Polyphaga
- Infraorder: Scarabaeiformia
- Family: Scarabaeidae
- Genus: Schizonycha
- Species: S. squamulosa

Binomial name
- Schizonycha squamulosa Moser, 1914

Species of beetle

Schizonycha squamulosa is a species of beetle of the family Scarabaeidae. It is found in Tanzania.

== Description ==
Adults reach a length of about 11 mm (0.43 in). They are similar to Schizonycha abdicta, but broader and more robust. The colouration is dark reddish-brown, the surface is covered with distinct scales. The head is robust, behind the middle of the clypeus keel there is a small, smooth transverse spot, the upturned anterior margin of the clypeus is barely perceptibly emarginate. The antennae are reddish-brown. The pronotum is densely punctate, the scales of the punctures are elliptical, becoming narrowly ovate towards the sides. The transverse ridge on both sides before the posterior margin is sculpted like the rest of the pronotum and therefore barely noticeable. The lateral margins of the pronotum are crenate, the anterior and posterior angles are obtuse, the former being shortly rounded. The scutellum is punctate everywhere. On the weakly wrinkled elytra, the punctures are moderately dense, their scales are elliptical, as are the scales on the pygidium, which is covered with umbilical punctures. The midlines of the thorax and abdomen are only very sparsely punctured.
