= Schizonycha parallela =

Scientific classification
- Kingdom: Animalia
- Phylum: Arthropoda
- Clade: Pancrustacea
- Class: Insecta
- Order: Coleoptera
- Suborder: Polyphaga
- Infraorder: Scarabaeiformia
- Family: Scarabaeidae
- Genus: Schizonycha
- Species: S. parallela

Binomial name
- Schizonycha parallela Moser, 1914

Species of beetle

Schizonycha parallela is a species of beetle of the family Scarabaeidae. It is found in Ethiopia.

== Description ==
Adults reach a length of about 12 mm (0.47 in). They are similar to Schizonycha abdicta, but the punctures on the pronotum are much more widely spaced. The head is weakly wrinkled and punctured, the punctures are whitish-bristled, the clypeus keel is weakly curved, the anterior margin is slightly emarginate. The pronotum is of a similar shape to that of abdicta and widely punctured in the posterior part, while towards the anterior margin the punctures become somewhat closer together. The punctures bear whitish setae, the transverse ridge on both sides before the base is smooth. The scutellum is punctured. On the elytra, the punctures are somewhat denser than in abdicta and are whitish-bristled. The pygidium is convex and moderately densely covered with umbilical punctures, which bear setae, becoming hairs towards the posterior margin. The chest is widely punctured in the middle, and the punctures are covered with erect, whitish, scale-like setae. The sides of the chest, the episterna, and the hind coxae are covered with elongated scales that are not particularly densely spaced. The abdomen bears widely punctured markings in the middle and somewhat closer punctures on the sides. These punctures are partly covered with yellow setae and partly with whitish, more scale-like setae.
