= Schizonycha distinguenda =

Scientific classification
- Kingdom: Animalia
- Phylum: Arthropoda
- Clade: Pancrustacea
- Class: Insecta
- Order: Coleoptera
- Suborder: Polyphaga
- Infraorder: Scarabaeiformia
- Family: Scarabaeidae
- Genus: Schizonycha
- Species: S. distinguenda

Binomial name
- Schizonycha distinguenda Moser, 1914

Species of beetle

Schizonycha distinguenda is a species of beetle of the family Scarabaeidae. It is found in Tanzania.

== Description ==
Adults reach a length of about 12 mm (0.47 in). They are similar to Schizonycha abdicta. The frons is broad and the clypeus somewhat more densely covered with coarse punctures. The clypeus keel is strongly projecting in the middle, the anterior margin of the clypeus is only very weakly emarginate. On the pronotum, the rather robust punctures are widely spaced and irregular and bear small, bristle-like, whitish scales. The transverse ridge before the posterior margin is only very narrowly elongate. The lateral margins are weakly notched and covered with erect setae. The anterior and posterior angles are obtusely angled. The scutellum bears a few scattered punctures. On the weakly transversely wrinkled elytra, the punctures are moderately dense and covered with whitish, scale-like setae. The pygidium is strongly punctate, and the punctures are slightly denser than on the elytra. The thorax is widely punctate in the middle, becoming more densely punctate laterally. The sides of the thorax, the episterna, and the hind coxae bear bristly hairs.
