= Schizonycha distincta =

Scientific classification
- Kingdom: Animalia
- Phylum: Arthropoda
- Clade: Pancrustacea
- Class: Insecta
- Order: Coleoptera
- Suborder: Polyphaga
- Infraorder: Scarabaeiformia
- Family: Scarabaeidae
- Genus: Schizonycha
- Species: S. distincta

Binomial name
- Schizonycha distincta Moser, 1914

Species of beetle

Schizonycha distincta is a species of beetle of the family Scarabaeidae. It is found in Tanzania.

== Description ==
Adults reach a length of about 12 mm (0.47 in). They are similar to Schizonycha abdicta. The colouration is yellowish-brown, with the head and pronotum somewhat darker. The punctures on the upper surface bear fine whitish setae. The head and pronotum are punctured, the clypeus keel is quite strongly projecting in the middle, the anterior margin of the clypeus is distinctly emarginate. The antennae are reddish-brown, with the club brownish-yellow. The pronotum is of a similar shape to that of abdicta, the transverse ridge before the posterior margin is likewise smooth and shiny. The lateral margins are finely serrated, weakly emarginate before the blunt anterior and posterior angles. The scutellum is punctate. On the elytra, the punctures are moderately dense. The pygidium is weakly wrinkled and covered with large umbilical punctures. The thorax, episterna, and hind coxae bear variegated, bristle-like hairs. The abdomen is somewhat wrinkled and almost uniformly covered with sparsely spaced, bristle-bearing punctures.
