= Schizonycha imitatrix =

Scientific classification
- Kingdom: Animalia
- Phylum: Arthropoda
- Clade: Pancrustacea
- Class: Insecta
- Order: Coleoptera
- Suborder: Polyphaga
- Infraorder: Scarabaeiformia
- Family: Scarabaeidae
- Genus: Schizonycha
- Species: S. imitatrix

Binomial name
- Schizonycha imitatrix Moser, 1914

Species of beetle

Schizonycha imitatrix is a species of beetle of the family Scarabaeidae. It is found in Ethiopia.

== Description ==
Adults reach a length of about 10 mm (0.39 in). They are similar to Schizonycha cylindrica, but the middle of the thorax is densely punctured and covered with short, erect, yellow setae. The head is similarly sculpted to that of cylindrica, the frons appears indented, and the clypeus is rounded. The pronotum is also similar in shape to that of cylindrica. It is somewhat more densely punctured and the punctures bear small, white setae in the middle, and elliptical scales beside the lateral margins. The scutellum is sparsely punctured. The punctures on the elytra are less deep, and the scales are somewhat stronger than in cylindrica. The pygidium is much more strongly convex than in the latter species. It is moderately densely punctured, and the punctures bear white bristle-like scales. The sides of the chest, the episterna, and the hind coxae are covered with oval scales. The abdomen is widely punctured in the middle, more densely punctured at the sides. The punctures are covered with elliptical scales, and some also with yellow setae.
