= Schizonycha angustula =

Scientific classification
- Kingdom: Animalia
- Phylum: Arthropoda
- Clade: Pancrustacea
- Class: Insecta
- Order: Coleoptera
- Suborder: Polyphaga
- Infraorder: Scarabaeiformia
- Family: Scarabaeidae
- Genus: Schizonycha
- Species: S. angustula

Binomial name
- Schizonycha angustula Moser, 1914

Species of beetle

Schizonycha angustula is a species of beetle of the family Scarabaeidae. It is found in Tanzania.

== Description ==
Adults reach a length of about 11 mm (0.43 in). They are similar to Schizonycha abdicta, but somewhat smaller. The head is wrinkled and punctate, the punctures are bristled, the clypeus keel is strong, with the anterior margin not emarginate. The pronotum is quite densely covered with punctures, which bear white setae. The transverse ridge on both sides before the posterior margin is smooth, the lateral margins are finely serrated, the anterior and posterior angles are obtuse. The scutellum is sparsely punctate. On the somewhat transversely wrinkled elytra, the punctures are moderately dense and white-bristled. The umbilical punctures of the pygidium bear erect yellowish setae. The underside is very sparsely punctate in the middle, while the punctures are more closely spaced at the sides. The punctures bear setae, which are stronger on the chest, episterna, and hind coxae than on the abdomen.
