= Schizonycha cylindrica =

Scientific classification
- Kingdom: Animalia
- Phylum: Arthropoda
- Clade: Pancrustacea
- Class: Insecta
- Order: Coleoptera
- Suborder: Polyphaga
- Infraorder: Scarabaeiformia
- Family: Scarabaeidae
- Genus: Schizonycha
- Species: S. cylindrica

Binomial name
- Schizonycha cylindrica Moser, 1914

Species of beetle

Schizonycha cylindrica is a species of beetle of the family Scarabaeidae. It is found in Tanzania.

== Description ==
Adults reach a length of about 10 mm (0.39 in). They are similar to Schizonycha angustula, but may be distinguished by the scales on the underside. The head is somewhat wrinkled and punctate, the clypeus keel is weakly curved, the clypeus tapers quite strongly towards the front, the anterior margin is barely perceptibly emarginate. The pronotum is sparsely covered with punctures, the lateral margins are very weakly notched, the anterior and posterior angles are obtuse and shortly rounded. The scutellum is smooth in the middle. The elytra are somewhat transversely wrinkled, densely punctate, the punctures bear bristle-like scales. The pygidium is quite sparsely covered with umbilical punctures, which bear white setae. The middle of the thorax is sparsely punctate and the punctures are covered with yellowish setae or white bristle-like scales. The sides of the chest, episterna, and hind coxae are quite densely covered with oval scales. The abdomen bears widely spaced, bristle-like punctures in the middle and the sides of the abdomen are moderately densely punctured, the punctures bearing elliptical or oblong-oval scales.
