= Schizonycha abdicta =

Scientific classification
- Kingdom: Animalia
- Phylum: Arthropoda
- Clade: Pancrustacea
- Class: Insecta
- Order: Coleoptera
- Suborder: Polyphaga
- Infraorder: Scarabaeiformia
- Family: Scarabaeidae
- Genus: Schizonycha
- Species: S. abdicta

Binomial name
- Schizonycha abdicta Brenske, 1898

Species of beetle

Schizonycha abdicta is a species of beetle of the family Scarabaeidae. It is found in Tanzania.

== Description ==
Adults reach a length of about 11–12 mm (0.43–0.47 in). They have an oblong, yellowish, almost dirty brown body, with fine scale-like hairs above, and distinctly scaled below. The clypeus is weakly rounded, finely granular and densely punctate. The pronotum is slightly indented anteriorly, with rounded anterior angles and angular posterior angles. It is densely granularly punctate with distinct scale-like hairs, with the middle narrowly smooth. The elytra are wrinkled and punctate. The pygidium is convex with minute hairs. The abdomen is less densely covered laterally with white, hair-like scales. The thorax is also white-haired in the middle, except for a narrow patch, and white-scaled laterally.
