= Schizonycha maritima =

Scientific classification
- Kingdom: Animalia
- Phylum: Arthropoda
- Clade: Pancrustacea
- Class: Insecta
- Order: Coleoptera
- Suborder: Polyphaga
- Infraorder: Scarabaeiformia
- Family: Scarabaeidae
- Genus: Schizonycha
- Species: S. maritima

Binomial name
- Schizonycha maritima Moser, 1914

Species of beetle

Schizonycha maritima is a species of beetle of the family Scarabaeidae. It is found in Ivory Coast.

== Description ==
Adults reach a length of about 15–16 mm (0.59–0.63 in). They are very similar to Schizonycha exclusa. The head is wrinkled and punctate, the punctures are covered with tiny scales, the clypeus keel is weakly curved, the anterior margin of the clypeus is truncate and barely perceptibly emarginate. The pronotum is less tapered anteriorly and posteriorly than in exclusa, the sculpture is similar, the ridge before the posterior margin is less smooth. The lateral margins are crenate, the anterior and posterior angles are obtuse. The punctures on the pronotum bear small scales. The scutellum is sparsely punctate with a smooth center. On the elytra, the punctures are of the same density as in exclusa and are covered with minute scales. The pygidium shows a very fine, leathery sculpture and also bears rather widely spaced umbilical punctures covered with small scales. The underside is only very sparsely punctured in the middle and the sides of the thorax, the episterna, and the hind coxae are covered with oval, white scales. Scattered yellow setae are also found on the sides of the thorax.
