= Schizonycha armipes =

Scientific classification
- Kingdom: Animalia
- Phylum: Arthropoda
- Clade: Pancrustacea
- Class: Insecta
- Order: Coleoptera
- Suborder: Polyphaga
- Infraorder: Scarabaeiformia
- Family: Scarabaeidae
- Genus: Schizonycha
- Species: S. armipes

Binomial name
- Schizonycha armipes Moser, 1914

Species of beetle

Schizonycha armipes is a species of beetle of the family Scarabaeidae. It is found in Senegal.

== Description ==
Adults reach a length of about 14 mm (0.55 in). They resemble Schizonycha africana in shape and colouration. The head is very sparsely punctate, the clypeus keel is flatly curved forward, and the anterior margin of the clypeus is rather deeply emarginate. The pronotum is of a similar shape to that of africana, but shorter. The surface is densely covered, somewhat more extensively than in africana, with coarse punctures, which bear extremely minute scales. The transverse ridge on either side of the posterior margin is narrow and smooth. The scutellum is sparsely punctate. The elytra are somewhat transversely wrinkled and quite densely covered with strong punctures, the scales of which are only visible under a magnifying glass. The pygidium shows an extremely fine, leathery sculpture and a dense, coarse punctation. On the underside, the spots are very widely spaced in the middle, closer together at the sides, and bear very small, bristle-like scales.
