= Schizonycha litoralis =

Scientific classification
- Kingdom: Animalia
- Phylum: Arthropoda
- Clade: Pancrustacea
- Class: Insecta
- Order: Coleoptera
- Suborder: Polyphaga
- Infraorder: Scarabaeiformia
- Family: Scarabaeidae
- Genus: Schizonycha
- Species: S. litoralis

Binomial name
- Schizonycha litoralis Moser, 1914

Species of beetle

Schizonycha litoralis is a species of beetle of the family Scarabaeidae. It is found in Ivory Coast.

== Description ==
Adults reach a length of about 12 mm (0.47 in). They are similar to Schizonycha exclusa, but smaller. The head is transversely punctate, and the clypeus keel is weak and does not reach the lateral margins. The anterior margin of the clypeus is upturned and barely perceptible, whereas in exclusa it is distinctly emarginate. The antennae are brown, while the club is yellowish-brown. The pronotum is similarly shaped to that of exclusa, but less tapered anteriorly. It is densely punctate, the punctures bear minute scales, the transverse ridge on each side before the posterior margin is smooth. The lateral margins are weakly serrated, the anterior and posterior angles are obtuse. The scutellum is smooth in the middle. On the very faintly wrinkled elytra, the punctures are moderately dense, and are covered with scales visible only under a magnifying glass. The pygidium is extensively covered with flat, minutely scaled punctures. The midlines of the thorax and abdomen are only very sparsely punctured. On the sides, the punctures are somewhat closer together, but still widely spaced. On the sides of the thorax, they bear partly white, oblong-ovate scales, partly yellowish setae.
