= Schizonycha errabunda =

Scientific classification
- Kingdom: Animalia
- Phylum: Arthropoda
- Clade: Pancrustacea
- Class: Insecta
- Order: Coleoptera
- Suborder: Polyphaga
- Infraorder: Scarabaeiformia
- Family: Scarabaeidae
- Genus: Schizonycha
- Species: S. errabunda

Binomial name
- Schizonycha errabunda Brenske, 1898

Species of beetle

Schizonycha errabunda is a species of beetle of the family Scarabaeidae. It is found in Sierra Leone.

== Description ==
Adults reach a length of about 14–15 mm (0.55–0.59 in). They are very similar to Schizonycha africana and related species in size and colour, but they differ significantly in the pattern of the punctures and the shape of the scales or hairs.
