= Schizonycha exclusa =

Scientific classification
- Kingdom: Animalia
- Phylum: Arthropoda
- Clade: Pancrustacea
- Class: Insecta
- Order: Coleoptera
- Suborder: Polyphaga
- Infraorder: Scarabaeiformia
- Family: Scarabaeidae
- Genus: Schizonycha
- Species: S. exclusa

Binomial name
- Schizonycha exclusa Brenske, 1898

Species of beetle

Schizonycha exclusa is a species of beetle of the family Scarabaeidae. It is found in Sierra Leone.

== Description ==
Adults reach a length of about 15 mm (0.59 in). They are very similar to Schizonycha errabunda and Schizonycha exigua. The clypeus is margined anteriorly and the sides of the pronotum are distinctly toothed. The elytra also only have tiny ridges. The pygidium is somewhat pointed. In females, it is very densely punctate, in males less densely and duller. The abdomen has fine setae on the middle of the segments, and laterally fine, white, bristly hairs, which are only slightly stronger than those of the upper surface. The thorax is densely covered with white scales.
