= Schizonycha exigua =

Scientific classification
- Kingdom: Animalia
- Phylum: Arthropoda
- Clade: Pancrustacea
- Class: Insecta
- Order: Coleoptera
- Suborder: Polyphaga
- Infraorder: Scarabaeiformia
- Family: Scarabaeidae
- Genus: Schizonycha
- Species: S. exigua

Binomial name
- Schizonycha exigua Brenske, 1898

Species of beetle

Schizonycha exigua is a species of beetle of the family Scarabaeidae. It is found in Sierra Leone.

== Description ==
Adults reach a length of about 17 mm (0.67 in). They are reddish yellowish-brown. The pronotum is widely punctate with tiny hairs and the scutellum is almost smooth. The pygidium is rounded, smooth in the middle, finely and widely punctate, with tiny hairs like those on the elytra. The abdomen is smooth in the middle with a fine row of hairs, laterally covered with fine white scale-like hairs.
