= Schizonycha africana =

Scientific classification
- Kingdom: Animalia
- Phylum: Arthropoda
- Clade: Pancrustacea
- Class: Insecta
- Order: Coleoptera
- Suborder: Polyphaga
- Infraorder: Scarabaeiformia
- Family: Scarabaeidae
- Genus: Schizonycha
- Species: S. africana

Binomial name
- Schizonycha africana (Laporte, 1840)

Synonyms
- Amphimallon africana Laporte, 1840

Species of beetle

Schizonycha africana is a species of beetle of the family Scarabaeidae. It is found in Angola, the Democratic Republic of the Congo, Senegal and Sudan.

== Description ==
Adults reach a length of about 16 mm (0.63 in). They have a long body and the thorax is covered with white scales. Also on the upper surface, there are white and distinct, but very small hairs. The punctures of the elytra are coarser than in related species. The pygidium is somewhat rounded, smooth at the tip, densely coarsely wrinkled and dotted. The abdomen is sparsely covered laterally with white scales, these are somewhat weaker than those on the thorax, but more distinct than in related species.
