= Schizonycha ambigua =

Scientific classification
- Kingdom: Animalia
- Phylum: Arthropoda
- Clade: Pancrustacea
- Class: Insecta
- Order: Coleoptera
- Suborder: Polyphaga
- Infraorder: Scarabaeiformia
- Family: Scarabaeidae
- Genus: Schizonycha
- Species: S. ambigua

Binomial name
- Schizonycha ambigua Péringuey, 1908

Species of beetle

Schizonycha ambigua is a species of beetle of the family Scarabaeidae. It is found in Zimbabwe.

== Description ==
Adults reach a length of about 10 mm (0.39 in). They are similar to Schizonycha infantilis and Schizonycha puerilis, but may be distinguished from the former by the more arcuate fore margin of the clypeus and from the latter, the clypeal margin of which is identical, by having a very sharp, transverse carina on the vertex of the head. The shape of the body is similar to that of the two related species, but the punctures on the pronotum are not asperous, even close to the sides, and the scutellum is more numerously pitted than in S. puerilis. The sculpture of the elytra is very nearly the same, but the propygidium is finely punctate in the lower half, and the pygidium is more deeply punctate than in S. puerilis, resembling thus that of S. infantilis.
