= Schizonycha meracula =

Scientific classification
- Kingdom: Animalia
- Phylum: Arthropoda
- Clade: Pancrustacea
- Class: Insecta
- Order: Coleoptera
- Suborder: Polyphaga
- Infraorder: Scarabaeiformia
- Family: Scarabaeidae
- Genus: Schizonycha
- Species: S. meracula

Binomial name
- Schizonycha meracula Péringuey, 1904

Species of beetle

Schizonycha meracula is a species of beetle of the family Scarabaeidae. It is found in Namibia.

== Description ==
Adults reach a length of about 11 mm (0.43 in). They are very similar to Schizonycha infantilis, but the corners of the clypeus are more broadly rounded, the very sharp carina is not sinuate, and is normally arcuate, but the basal carina which is not very sharp, especially laterally, is produced in a triangle the apex of which is prolonged into a not very well defined longitudinal raised line reaching the centre of the frontal carina. The punctures are plainly asperous in the frontal part and more shallow on the clypeus. On the pronotum, which is of nearly similar shape but less obliquely attenuate laterally, the punctures in the posterior part are a little more scattered, and there is on the median part a somewhat indistinct longitudinal smooth space. The punctures on the scutellum are less numerous. On the elytra, the discoidal part is somewhat coriaceous owing to some sub-transverse slightly raised folds, and the very briefly setigerous punctures are a little wider apart.
