= Schizonycha parilis =

Scientific classification
- Kingdom: Animalia
- Phylum: Arthropoda
- Clade: Pancrustacea
- Class: Insecta
- Order: Coleoptera
- Suborder: Polyphaga
- Infraorder: Scarabaeiformia
- Family: Scarabaeidae
- Genus: Schizonycha
- Species: S. parilis

Binomial name
- Schizonycha parilis Péringuey, 1904

Species of beetle

Schizonycha parilis is a species of beetle of the family Scarabaeidae. It is found in Zimbabwe.

== Description ==
Adults reach a length of about 10.5–11 mm (0.41–0.43 in). They are light testaceous, with the head and pronotum testaceous-red. They resemble extremely Schizonycha transvaalica. The sculpture is the same, but the head is not quite as broad and the clypeus, which is semicircular in the female, is less broadly truncate, but also plainly emarginate. Furthermore, penultimate abdominal segment is broader than the one preceding, the sides of these segments are more numerously punctured and the punctures of the pygidium leave in the middle an impunctate longitudinal area.
