= Schizonycha puerilis =

Scientific classification
- Kingdom: Animalia
- Phylum: Arthropoda
- Clade: Pancrustacea
- Class: Insecta
- Order: Coleoptera
- Suborder: Polyphaga
- Infraorder: Scarabaeiformia
- Family: Scarabaeidae
- Genus: Schizonycha
- Species: S. puerilis

Binomial name
- Schizonycha puerilis Péringuey, 1904

Species of beetle

Schizonycha puerilis is a species of beetle of the family Scarabaeidae. It is found in Namibia and South Africa (Northern Cape, Western Cape).

== Description ==
Adults reach a length of about 9.5–10 mm (0.37–0.39 in). They are very similar to Schizonycha parilis, but the clypeus of the males is only moderately blunt and not sinuate, the punctures on the median discoidal part of the pronotum are a little broader, more widely scattered, and there is a somewhat distinct median smooth space. Also, the pygidium has only a few punctures, mostly noticeable on the sides of the base.
