= Schizonycha transvaalica =

Scientific classification
- Kingdom: Animalia
- Phylum: Arthropoda
- Clade: Pancrustacea
- Class: Insecta
- Order: Coleoptera
- Suborder: Polyphaga
- Infraorder: Scarabaeiformia
- Family: Scarabaeidae
- Genus: Schizonycha
- Species: S. transvaalica

Binomial name
- Schizonycha transvaalica Péringuey, 1904

Species of beetle

Schizonycha transvaalica is a species of beetle of the family Scarabaeidae. It is found in South Africa (KwaZulu-Natal) and Zimbabwe.

== Description ==
Adults reach a length of about 11 mm (0.43 in). They are brick-red, with the elytra slightly paler than the pronotum. The surface of the whole head, including the basal part, is covered with round, deep, non-contiguous punctures. The pronotum is covered with somewhat deep, round punctures separated from each other by a space wider than their own diameter, and somewhat asperous on the sides and along the anterior part, the outer margin is only very slightly serrulate, and only in the posterior part. The scutellum is deeply and closely punctured and the elytra are covered with deep punctures separated by an interval about equal to their diameter, and slightly cicatricose in the anterior part. The pygidium has somewhat closely set, deep foveate punctures.
