= Schizonycha infantilis =

Scientific classification
- Kingdom: Animalia
- Phylum: Arthropoda
- Clade: Pancrustacea
- Class: Insecta
- Order: Coleoptera
- Suborder: Polyphaga
- Infraorder: Scarabaeiformia
- Family: Scarabaeidae
- Genus: Schizonycha
- Species: S. infantilis

Binomial name
- Schizonycha infantilis Péringuey, 1904

Species of beetle

Schizonycha infantilis is a species of beetle of the family Scarabaeidae. It is found in Namibia and Zimbabwe.

== Description ==
Adults reach a length of about 10–11 mm (0.39–0.43 in). They are pale testaceous, with the head and pronotum light brick-red. The clypeus is covered with round, broad not contiguous punctures, and there is no trace of clypeal suture. The pronotum is covered with nearly equi-distant punctures, smaller and more scabrose in the anterior than in the posterior part, and separated everywhere by a space of about their own diameter, the anterior part is transversely impressed, and the lateral fringe of setae is not dense. The scutellum is very closely punctured all over and the elytra are covered with closely set punctures separated from each other by a space equal to their width and bearing each a very small, flavescent hair. The pygidium is covered with closely set foveolate punctures.
