= Schizonycha laeviscutata =

Scientific classification
- Kingdom: Animalia
- Phylum: Arthropoda
- Clade: Pancrustacea
- Class: Insecta
- Order: Coleoptera
- Suborder: Polyphaga
- Infraorder: Scarabaeiformia
- Family: Scarabaeidae
- Genus: Schizonycha
- Species: S. laeviscutata

Binomial name
- Schizonycha laeviscutata Moser, 1914

Species of beetle

Schizonycha laeviscutata is a species of beetle of the family Scarabaeidae. It is found in Tanzania.

== Description ==
Adults reach a length of about 10 mm (0.39 in). They are similar to Schizonycha kakomae in colour and shape, but smaller and distinguished by several peculiarities. The head is wrinkled and punctate, the clypeus keel runs parallel to the clypeus suture, the clypeus itself is very long, its anterior margin is somewhat truncated, not emarginate. The pronotum is about half as wide as it is long, the punctation becomes denser and rasp-like towards the anterior margin, and there is a small smooth spot behind the middle. The transverse ridge on both sides before the posterior margin is also smooth. The lateral margins are not serrated, the anterior angles are short, the posterior angles more broadly rounded. The scutellum is unpunctate. On the elytra, the punctures are moderately dense and bear tiny setae visible only under a magnifying glass. The pygidium is widely and shallowly punctured. The thorax has a longitudinal groove in the middle. The groove is smooth, and on either side of the groove are extremely strong, thorn-like setae. The abdominal segments also bear a transverse row of erect setae in the middle, which, however, are not as strong as those on the thorax. The sides of the thorax and abdomen, the episterna, and the hind coxae are fairly widely punctured. These punctures are covered with bristle-like hairs.
