= Schizonycha parva =

Scientific classification
- Kingdom: Animalia
- Phylum: Arthropoda
- Clade: Pancrustacea
- Class: Insecta
- Order: Coleoptera
- Suborder: Polyphaga
- Infraorder: Scarabaeiformia
- Family: Scarabaeidae
- Genus: Schizonycha
- Species: S. parva

Binomial name
- Schizonycha parva Moser, 1914

Species of beetle

Schizonycha parva is a species of beetle of the family Scarabaeidae. It is found in Tanzania.

== Description ==
Adults reach a length of about 9 mm (0.35 in). They are similar to Schizonycha manowensis, with the same shape and colouration. Behind the vertex keel is a row of white, bristle-bearing punctures. The frons bears punctures arranged in transverse rows, also bearing white setae. The clypeus is sparsely punctured, its anterior margin showing hardly any indication of a bulge. The pronotum is punctured, with the punctures quite widely spaced in the middle and more densely packed at the sides. They are much weaker than in manowensis and covered with narrow, bristle-like scales. The transverse ridge on both sides before the posterior margin is indistinct. The scutellum bears several bristle-bearing punctures. The sculpture of the elytra is similar to that of manowensis, the scales being slightly stronger. The pygidium is densely covered with tiny, scaled umbilical punctures. The middle of the thorax is almost smooth and the sides of the thorax, the episterna, and the hind coxae are extensively punctured, and the punctures are covered with elliptical scales that are much broader than in manowensis. The abdomen is extensively covered in the middle with bristle-bearing punctures. Towards the sides, the punctures become more closely spaced and bear narrow scales.
