= Schizonycha manowensis =

Scientific classification
- Kingdom: Animalia
- Phylum: Arthropoda
- Clade: Pancrustacea
- Class: Insecta
- Order: Coleoptera
- Suborder: Polyphaga
- Infraorder: Scarabaeiformia
- Family: Scarabaeidae
- Genus: Schizonycha
- Species: S. manowensis

Binomial name
- Schizonycha manowensis Moser, 1914

Species of beetle

Schizonycha manowensis is a species of beetle of the family Scarabaeidae. It is found in Tanzania.

== Description ==
Adults reach a length of about 10 mm (0.39 in). They are similar to Schizonycha kakomae, but significantly smaller. They differ mainly in the distinct sculpture and covering of the thorax. The head is coarsely punctate, the frons is smooth behind the projected middle of the clypeus keel. The clypeus is short, its anterior margin is barely perceptibly emarginate. The pronotum is almost twice as wide as it is long, coarsely punctate, the punctures are rather widely spaced and irregular and bear small scales. The transverse ridge on both sides before the posterior margin is smooth. The lateral margins are weakly serrated, the anterior and posterior angles are obtuse and shortly rounded. The scutellum is punctate laterally. The elytra are weakly wrinkled, bear moderately dense punctation, and the punctures are covered with small, narrow scales. On the pygidium, the umbilical punctures are quite widely spaced. The thorax is smooth in the middle and the sides of the thorax and abdomen, the episterna, and the hind coxae are widely punctate, the punctures with narrow, elliptical, almost bristle-like, white scales. On the abdomen, there are also occasional yellow setae.
