= Schizonycha kakomae =

Scientific classification
- Kingdom: Animalia
- Phylum: Arthropoda
- Clade: Pancrustacea
- Class: Insecta
- Order: Coleoptera
- Suborder: Polyphaga
- Infraorder: Scarabaeiformia
- Family: Scarabaeidae
- Genus: Schizonycha
- Species: S. kakomae

Binomial name
- Schizonycha kakomae Brenske, 1898

Species of beetle

Schizonycha kakomae is a species of beetle of the family Scarabaeidae. It is found in Rwanda.

== Description ==
Adults reach a length of about 11.5 mm (0.45 in). They have a slender and narrow body, like Schizonycha nyassica, but without distinct scales on the surface, even on the thorax. There are only fine white hairs laterally, which are more bristle-like than scale-like. The colour is yellowish-brown, with a redder pronotum. The pronotum is shortened, indented anteriorly, with a broad margin and rounded apical angles, the sides strongly rounded, not notched, sparsely coarsely punctate. The elytra are more densely, less coarsely punctate with very minute hairs. The rounded pygidium is finely punctate.
