= Schizonycha crenaticollis =

Scientific classification
- Kingdom: Animalia
- Phylum: Arthropoda
- Clade: Pancrustacea
- Class: Insecta
- Order: Coleoptera
- Suborder: Polyphaga
- Infraorder: Scarabaeiformia
- Family: Scarabaeidae
- Genus: Schizonycha
- Species: S. crenaticollis

Binomial name
- Schizonycha crenaticollis Moser, 1914

Species of beetle

Schizonycha crenaticollis is a species of beetle of the family Scarabaeidae. It is found in Togo.

== Description ==
Adults reach a length of about 18 mm (0.71 in). They are similar to Schizonycha crenata. They are of the same shape and colouration. The head is extensively covered with punctures, much more extensively than in crenata. The pronotum is of a similar shape, but the anterior angles are weakly projected, so that they appear less blunt. Also, the lateral margins are somewhat upturned before the anterior angles. The surface is much more extensively punctured, particularly before the posterior margin, where the pronotum is largely unpunctate on both sides of the middle. The scutellum bears only a few punctures. On the elytra, which are very weakly wrinkled, the coarse punctures are moderately dense and bear minute setae. The pygidium is rather extensively punctured. The thorax is covered with yellowish pubescence, the abdomen is almost smooth in the middle and broadly impressed in males.
