= Schizonycha luridipennis =

Scientific classification
- Kingdom: Animalia
- Phylum: Arthropoda
- Clade: Pancrustacea
- Class: Insecta
- Order: Coleoptera
- Suborder: Polyphaga
- Infraorder: Scarabaeiformia
- Family: Scarabaeidae
- Genus: Schizonycha
- Species: S. luridipennis

Binomial name
- Schizonycha luridipennis Moser, 1914

Species of beetle

Schizonycha luridipennis is a species of beetle of the family Scarabaeidae. It is found in the Democratic Republic of the Congo.

== Description ==
Adults reach a length of about 18 mm (0.71 in). They are similar to Schizonycha subrugipennis. The elytra are dark yellow, and the head and pronotum are red. The head is less densely wrinkled than in subrugipennis, the frons is also smooth in the middle behind the clypeus keel, and the anterior margin of the clypeus is weakly emarginate. The pronotum is slightly shorter than in the latter species, and the punctation is not quite as dense. The elytra are much less wrinkled, and the suture is somewhat convex, which is not the case in subrugipennis. The pygidium has strong, umbilical punctures with short setae. The thorax, episterna, and hind coxae are covered with yellow hairs.
