= Schizonycha subrugipennis =

Scientific classification
- Kingdom: Animalia
- Phylum: Arthropoda
- Clade: Pancrustacea
- Class: Insecta
- Order: Coleoptera
- Suborder: Polyphaga
- Infraorder: Scarabaeiformia
- Family: Scarabaeidae
- Genus: Schizonycha
- Species: S. subrugipennis

Binomial name
- Schizonycha subrugipennis Moser, 1914

Species of beetle

Schizonycha subrugipennis is a species of beetle of the family Scarabaeidae. It is found in the Democratic Republic of the Congo.

== Description ==
Adults reach a length of about 18 mm (0.71 in). They are similar to Schizonycha crenata. The head is wrinkled and punctate and the frons is smooth behind the middle of the clypeus keel, which is not the case in crenata. The anterior margin of the clypeus is weakly emarginate. The pronotum is rather densely punctate, much more densely than in crenata, with the punctures bearing minute setae. The ridge before the posterior margin is smooth, the lateral margins finely crenate, and the anterior and posterior angles are short and rounded. The scutellum is smooth in the middle and the elytra are weakly wrinkled, much more densely but less coarsely punctate than in crenata. The setae of the punctures are minute. The pygidium displays a very fine, leathery sculpture alongside moderately dense, coarse, short-setate punctures. The thorax, episterna, and hind coxae are covered with yellow pubescence.
