= Schizonycha crenata =

Scientific classification
- Kingdom: Animalia
- Phylum: Arthropoda
- Clade: Pancrustacea
- Class: Insecta
- Order: Coleoptera
- Suborder: Polyphaga
- Infraorder: Scarabaeiformia
- Family: Scarabaeidae
- Genus: Schizonycha
- Species: S. crenata

Binomial name
- Schizonycha crenata (Gyllenhal, 1817)

Synonyms
- Melolontha crenata Gyllenhal, 1817; Schizonycha crenata densior Brenske, 1898; Melolontha serricollis Hope, 1831

Species of beetle

Schizonycha crenata is a species of beetle of the family Scarabaeidae. It is found in Sudan, Nigeria and Ivory Coast.

== Description ==
Adults reach a length of about 19 mm (0.75 in). They are easily recognizable by their strongly notched pronotum, the claws are almost entirely equally divided, the upper tip being only very slightly more pointed. Furthermore, the first tarsal segment is scarcely a little shorter than the second. The pronotum is coarsely punctate, the punctures are large, round, sharply defined, and impressed down to the blurred posterior margin, then surrounded by a duller impression, which is interrupted anteriorly by the backward-pointing, tiny, bristle-like scales, giving it a kidney-shaped appearance. The punctures on the elytra lack the sharp border.

== Subspecies ==
- Schizonycha crenata crenata
- Schizonycha crenata sudanensis Moser, 1914 (Sudan)
