= Schizonycha piceonigra =

Scientific classification
- Kingdom: Animalia
- Phylum: Arthropoda
- Clade: Pancrustacea
- Class: Insecta
- Order: Coleoptera
- Suborder: Polyphaga
- Infraorder: Scarabaeiformia
- Family: Scarabaeidae
- Genus: Schizonycha
- Species: S. piceonigra

Binomial name
- Schizonycha piceonigra Pope, 1960

Species of beetle

Schizonycha piceonigra is a species of beetle of the family Scarabaeidae. It is found in South Africa (Gauteng, Limpopo).

== Description ==
Adults reach a length of about 10.5–12.5 mm (0.41–0.49 in). They are black to piceous and dull. They are very similar to both Schizonycha compacta and Schizonycha spuria.
