= Schizonycha constrata =

Scientific classification
- Kingdom: Animalia
- Phylum: Arthropoda
- Clade: Pancrustacea
- Class: Insecta
- Order: Coleoptera
- Suborder: Polyphaga
- Infraorder: Scarabaeiformia
- Family: Scarabaeidae
- Genus: Schizonycha
- Species: S. constrata

Binomial name
- Schizonycha constrata Péringuey, 1904

Species of beetle

Schizonycha constrata is a species of beetle of the family Scarabaeidae. It is found in South Africa (Gauteng, Limpopo).

== Description ==
Adults reach a length of about 13.5 mm (0.53 in). They are ferruginous, and with all the punctures bearing each a conspicuous whitish hair. The club of the antennae is testaceous. They have the same build as Schizonycha rufina, but is shorter although not more slender in proportion to its size.
