= Schizonycha rufina =

Scientific classification
- Kingdom: Animalia
- Phylum: Arthropoda
- Clade: Pancrustacea
- Class: Insecta
- Order: Coleoptera
- Suborder: Polyphaga
- Infraorder: Scarabaeiformia
- Family: Scarabaeidae
- Genus: Schizonycha
- Species: S. rufina

Binomial name
- Schizonycha rufina Boheman, 1857

Species of beetle

Schizonycha rufina is a species of beetle of the family Scarabaeidae. It is found in South Africa (Mpumalanga, Gauteng, Northern Cape).

== Description ==
Adults reach a length of about 13–18 mm (0.51–0.71 in). They are rusty-red, with a minute hair in every puncture. In general appearance it very much resembles Schizonycha spuria, but the punctuation of the pronotum is different on account of the punctures being cicatricose and also more asperous in the anterior part of the sides, which are also less ampliated at about the median part, and less obliquely attenuate towards the basal angle, the median longitudinal smooth space when it occurs is also more conspicuous, and the punctures on the scutellum and elytra are a little broader. The punctures on the pygidium are also deeper and more cicatricose.
