= Schizonycha compacta =

Scientific classification
- Kingdom: Animalia
- Phylum: Arthropoda
- Clade: Pancrustacea
- Class: Insecta
- Order: Coleoptera
- Suborder: Polyphaga
- Infraorder: Scarabaeiformia
- Family: Scarabaeidae
- Genus: Schizonycha
- Species: S. compacta

Binomial name
- Schizonycha compacta Pope, 1960

Species of beetle

Schizonycha compacta is a species of beetle of the family Scarabaeidae. It is found in South Africa (KwaZulu-Natal).

== Description ==
Adults reach a length of about 12.5–13.5 mm (0.49–0.53 in). They are black to piceous and not very shining.
