= Schizonycha spuria =

Scientific classification
- Kingdom: Animalia
- Phylum: Arthropoda
- Clade: Pancrustacea
- Class: Insecta
- Order: Coleoptera
- Suborder: Polyphaga
- Infraorder: Scarabaeiformia
- Family: Scarabaeidae
- Genus: Schizonycha
- Species: S. spuria

Binomial name
- Schizonycha spuria Péringuey, 1904

Species of beetle

Schizonycha spuria is a species of beetle of the family Scarabaeidae. It is found in South Africa (Mpumalanga, Gauteng, North West).

== Description ==
Adults reach a length of about 12–13 mm (0.47–0.51 in). They are black and moderately shining. The palpi, antennae and legs are piceous. The pronotum has the outer margin plainly serrate and often fringed with dense fulvous hairs. The surface is covered with irregular, transverse, slightly raised smooth folds in the intervals of which are some slightly scabrose fovae bearing each an appressed, very distinct squamose greyish hair. The scutellum is raised in the centre, and the lateral punctures are squamose. The elytra are covered with deep punctures bearing each a conspicuous squamose greyish hair, from the base to past the median part the intervals are raised, and coriaceous. The pygidium is impunctate.
