= Schizonycha stenolepis =

Scientific classification
- Kingdom: Animalia
- Phylum: Arthropoda
- Clade: Pancrustacea
- Class: Insecta
- Order: Coleoptera
- Suborder: Polyphaga
- Infraorder: Scarabaeiformia
- Family: Scarabaeidae
- Genus: Schizonycha
- Species: S. stenolepis

Binomial name
- Schizonycha stenolepis Moser, 1914

Species of beetle

Schizonycha stenolepis is a species of beetle of the family Scarabaeidae. It is found in Ethiopia.

== Description ==
Adults reach a length of about 17 mm (0.67 in). They are similar to Schizonycha grossa and Schizonycha lepidiota, but the scales on the thorax are not egg-shaped. All punctures on the upper surface bear narrow, pointed, almost bristle-like white scales. The head is somewhat wrinkled and punctured, the clypeus keel is projecting forward in the middle, and the anterior margin of the clypeus is not emarginate. The antennae are reddish-brown. The pronotum is almost of the same shape as in grosa. The surface is quite densely punctured, and the transverse ridge on each side before the posterior margin is narrowly smooth. The scutellum is unpunctate in the middle. The elytra bear, in addition to extremely fine and dense punctation, perceptible only with a magnifying glass, coarser punctures that are often very close together. The punctures on the pygidium are faint and somewhat closer together than on the elytra. The underside is widely punctured in the middle, more densely on the sides and the punctures are covered with long, narrow scales.
