= Schizonycha lepidiota =

Scientific classification
- Kingdom: Animalia
- Phylum: Arthropoda
- Clade: Pancrustacea
- Class: Insecta
- Order: Coleoptera
- Suborder: Polyphaga
- Infraorder: Scarabaeiformia
- Family: Scarabaeidae
- Genus: Schizonycha
- Species: S. lepidiota

Binomial name
- Schizonycha lepidiota Moser, 1914

Species of beetle

Schizonycha lepidiota is a species of beetle of the family Scarabaeidae. It is found in Mozambique.

== Description ==
Adults reach a length of about 18–20 mm (0.71–0.79 in). They are similar to Schizonycha grossa, but more strongly scaled on the upper surface. The head is somewhat wrinkled-punctate, the punctures are covered with bristle-like scales. The antennae are brown. The pronotum is almost twice as wide as it is long. It is strongly and weakly wrinkled-punctate, the scales of the punctures are elliptical, the lateral margins are notched, the anterior and posterior angles are obtuse. A spot in the middle of the pronotum and the two transverse ridges before the posterior margin are more or less smooth. The scutellum is covered with scale-like punctures. The elytra are moderately densely punctate and weakly wrinkled. The scales of the punctures are elliptical, slightly pointed at the end. The pygidium is quite extensively covered with umbilical punctures, which bear bristle-like scales.
