= Schizonycha grossa =

Scientific classification
- Kingdom: Animalia
- Phylum: Arthropoda
- Clade: Pancrustacea
- Class: Insecta
- Order: Coleoptera
- Suborder: Polyphaga
- Infraorder: Scarabaeiformia
- Family: Scarabaeidae
- Genus: Schizonycha
- Species: S. grossa

Binomial name
- Schizonycha grossa Brenske, 1898

Species of beetle

Schizonycha grossa is a species of beetle of the family Scarabaeidae. It is found in Kenya and Tanzania.

== Description ==
Adults reach a length of about 17 mm (0.67 in). They have a coarsely punctate pronotum, which is distinctly notched laterally with a smooth patch in the middle, the scales are narrow. The elytra are less coarsely punctate, and covered with scale-like hairs. The abdomen and thorax are fairly densely covered laterally with stronger, ovate to pointed scales. The thorax has hairs on the lateral margin.
