= Schizonycha kristenseni =

Scientific classification
- Kingdom: Animalia
- Phylum: Arthropoda
- Clade: Pancrustacea
- Class: Insecta
- Order: Coleoptera
- Suborder: Polyphaga
- Infraorder: Scarabaeiformia
- Family: Scarabaeidae
- Genus: Schizonycha
- Species: S. kristenseni

Binomial name
- Schizonycha kristenseni Moser, 1914

Species of beetle

Schizonycha kristenseni is a species of beetle of the family Scarabaeidae. It is found in Ethiopia.

== Description ==
Adults reach a length of about 13 mm (0.51 in). They are similar to Schizonycha squamulata, but the scales on the upper surface are minuscule, only visible under a magnifying glass. The head is somewhat wrinkled and punctate, the clypeus keel is slightly projecting in the middle, and the anterior margin of the clypeus is very faintly emarginate. The pronotum is almost twice as wide as it is long, quite extensively covered with punctures. The transverse ridge on both sides before the posterior margin is smooth. The lateral margins are notched and have erect setae and the anterior and posterior angles are obtuse. The scutellum bears a few punctures laterally. The elytra are weakly wrinkled and densely punctate. On the pygidium, the strong umbilical punctures are at the same density as on the elytra or slightly closer together. The thorax is smooth in the middle. The sides of the thorax, the episterna, and the hind coxae are hairy, some of the hairs being bristle-like. The middle of the abdomen bears only scattered punctures, while the sides of the abdomen are sparsely punctured, the punctures bearing yellow setae.
