= Schizonycha hamifera =

Scientific classification
- Kingdom: Animalia
- Phylum: Arthropoda
- Clade: Pancrustacea
- Class: Insecta
- Order: Coleoptera
- Suborder: Polyphaga
- Infraorder: Scarabaeiformia
- Family: Scarabaeidae
- Genus: Schizonycha
- Species: S. hamifera

Binomial name
- Schizonycha hamifera Moser, 1914

Species of beetle

Schizonycha hamifera is a species of beetle of the family Scarabaeidae. It is found in Ethiopia.

== Description ==
Adults reach a length of about 17 mm (0.67 in). They are similar to Schizonycha squamulata, but more robust and more strongly scaled on the upper side. The head is wrinkled and punctate, the punctures are bristled. The clypeus tapers only slightly towards the front, its upturned anterior margin is shallowly emarginate. The pronotum is somewhat longer than in squamulata, rather densely striate, and somewhat rasp-like punctate in the anterior part. The scales of the punctures are narrow and bristle-like. The transverse ridge on both sides before the base is also punctate. The lateral margins are weakly notched and bristled, the anterior and posterior angles are obtuse and shortly rounded. The scutellum is almost unpunctate. The elytra are weakly wrinkled and moderately densely punctate and the scales are narrow. The pygidium is rather extensively covered with white bristle-bearing umbilical punctures.
