= Schizonycha squamulata =

Scientific classification
- Kingdom: Animalia
- Phylum: Arthropoda
- Clade: Pancrustacea
- Class: Insecta
- Order: Coleoptera
- Suborder: Polyphaga
- Infraorder: Scarabaeiformia
- Family: Scarabaeidae
- Genus: Schizonycha
- Species: S. squamulata

Binomial name
- Schizonycha squamulata Brenske, 1895

Species of beetle

Schizonycha squamulata is a species of beetle of the family Scarabaeidae. It is found in Ethiopia.

== Description ==
Adults reach a length of about 15.5–16.5 mm (0.61–0.65 in). The upper surface has whitish, scale-like setae. The clypeus is rounded, densely and roughly punctate, carinate before the suture and the frons and thorax are loosely and roughly punctate. The pygidium is rounded and loosely punctate.
