= Schizonycha lepichaeta =

Scientific classification
- Kingdom: Animalia
- Phylum: Arthropoda
- Clade: Pancrustacea
- Class: Insecta
- Order: Coleoptera
- Suborder: Polyphaga
- Infraorder: Scarabaeiformia
- Family: Scarabaeidae
- Genus: Schizonycha
- Species: S. lepichaeta

Binomial name
- Schizonycha lepichaeta Moser, 1914

Species of beetle

Schizonycha lepichaeta is a species of beetle of the family Scarabaeidae. It is found in Tanzania.

== Description ==
Adults reach a length of about 14 mm (0.55 in). They are similar to Schizonycha meinhardti in shape and colouration. The head is strongly punctate and behind the clypeus keel, which is projected in the middle and does not reach the lateral margins, the frons is smooth. The anterior margin of the clypeus is emarginate. The pronotum is almost twice as wide as it is long, rather extensively punctate, and becoming more densely punctate towards the anterior margin. A spot in the middle and the transverse ridges before the posterior margin are smooth. The lateral margins are weakly notched and the anterior and posterior angles are obtuse, the former being shortly rounded. The scutellum bears several strong punctures. The weakly transversely wrinkled elytra are very densely punctate, the punctures bearing small, whitish setae. On the pygidium, the umbilical punctures are as densely packed as the punctures on the elytra and are covered with small setae. The underside is widely punctured in the middle, more densely along the sides and the punctures are covered with fine setae, and hairs are present on the middle of the thorax.
