= Schizonycha usambarica =

Scientific classification
- Kingdom: Animalia
- Phylum: Arthropoda
- Clade: Pancrustacea
- Class: Insecta
- Order: Coleoptera
- Suborder: Polyphaga
- Infraorder: Scarabaeiformia
- Family: Scarabaeidae
- Genus: Schizonycha
- Species: S. usambarica

Binomial name
- Schizonycha usambarica Moser, 1914

Species of beetle

Schizonycha usambarica is a species of beetle of the family Scarabaeidae. It is found in Tanzania.

== Description ==
Adults reach a length of about 13–14 mm (0.51–0.55 in). They are similar to Schizonycha meinhardti. The head is somewhat wrinkled and punctate. The anterior margin of the clypeus is barely noticeable, whereas in meinhardti it is distinctly emarginate. The shape and sculpture of the pronotum are similar in both species, but the punctures are slightly closer together in usambarica. The scutellum bears several punctures laterally. The elytra are weakly wrinkled and densely covered with strong punctures, which bear small, bristle-like scales.
