= Schizonycha meinhardti =

Scientific classification
- Kingdom: Animalia
- Phylum: Arthropoda
- Clade: Pancrustacea
- Class: Insecta
- Order: Coleoptera
- Suborder: Polyphaga
- Infraorder: Scarabaeiformia
- Family: Scarabaeidae
- Genus: Schizonycha
- Species: S. meinhardti

Binomial name
- Schizonycha meinhardti Brenske, 1898

Species of beetle

Schizonycha meinhardti is a species of beetle of the family Scarabaeidae. It is found in Tanzania.

== Description ==
Adults reach a length of about 13 mm (0.51 in). They have a narrow, cylindrical body. The clypeus and frons are lightly punctate. The pronotum is covered with coarse punctures here. The sides of the pronotum are almost straight. The elytra are densely and slightly wrinkledly punctate, with short white setae, which are also found on the pronotum. The fine granular punctation is most pronounced on the pygidium.
