= Schizonycha perplexabilis =

Scientific classification
- Kingdom: Animalia
- Phylum: Arthropoda
- Clade: Pancrustacea
- Class: Insecta
- Order: Coleoptera
- Suborder: Polyphaga
- Infraorder: Scarabaeiformia
- Family: Scarabaeidae
- Genus: Schizonycha
- Species: S. perplexabilis

Binomial name
- Schizonycha perplexabilis Péringuey, 1904

Species of beetle

Schizonycha perplexabilis is a species of beetle of the family Scarabaeidae. It is found in Zimbabwe.

== Description ==
Adults reach a length of about 13 mm (0.51 in). They are piceous, with the club of antennae flavescent. They have the same shape as Schizonycha durbana and Schizonycha saga, but the clypeus is more distinctly sinuated, and the hairs in the punctures are more visible on the upper side. The punctures on the pronotum are as broadly foveate as in S. saga, and the intervals are similar.
