= Schizonycha quaesita =

Scientific classification
- Kingdom: Animalia
- Phylum: Arthropoda
- Clade: Pancrustacea
- Class: Insecta
- Order: Coleoptera
- Suborder: Polyphaga
- Infraorder: Scarabaeiformia
- Family: Scarabaeidae
- Genus: Schizonycha
- Species: S. quaesita

Binomial name
- Schizonycha quaesita Péringuey, 1904

Species of beetle

Schizonycha quaesita is a species of beetle of the family Scarabaeidae. It is found in South Africa (Gauteng, North West).

== Description ==
Adults reach a length of about 13.5–14 mm (0.53–0.55 in). They are black, with the palpi, antennae and tarsi piceous. They are similar to Schizonycha durbana, but it is a little more robust, and the shape of the genital armature differs considerably.
