= Schizonycha saga =

Scientific classification
- Kingdom: Animalia
- Phylum: Arthropoda
- Clade: Pancrustacea
- Class: Insecta
- Order: Coleoptera
- Suborder: Polyphaga
- Infraorder: Scarabaeiformia
- Family: Scarabaeidae
- Genus: Schizonycha
- Species: S. saga

Binomial name
- Schizonycha saga Péringuey, 1904

Species of beetle

Schizonycha saga is a species of beetle of the family Scarabaeidae. It is found in South Africa (Western Cape).

== Description ==
Adults reach a length of about 12.5–13 mm (0.49–0.51 in). They are fuscous or very dark brown, with the palpi and antennae ferruginous and the legs piceous-red. They are very similar to Schizonycha durbana, but the elytra of the male are not quite so cylindrical, being slightly ampliated laterally in the posterior part.
