= Schizonycha durbana =

Scientific classification
- Kingdom: Animalia
- Phylum: Arthropoda
- Clade: Pancrustacea
- Class: Insecta
- Order: Coleoptera
- Suborder: Polyphaga
- Infraorder: Scarabaeiformia
- Family: Scarabaeidae
- Genus: Schizonycha
- Species: S. durbana

Binomial name
- Schizonycha durbana Péringuey, 1904

Species of beetle

Schizonycha durbana is a species of beetle of the family Scarabaeidae. It is found in South Africa (KwaZulu-Natal).

== Description ==
Adults reach a length of about 12.5–13.5 mm (0.49–0.53 in). They are piceous-black, with the palpi and the antennae chestnut-brown. Each puncture on the upper side bears a very minute greyish hair, and the pectus is somewhat thickly hairy.
