= Schizonycha rugifrons =

Scientific classification
- Kingdom: Animalia
- Phylum: Arthropoda
- Clade: Pancrustacea
- Class: Insecta
- Order: Coleoptera
- Suborder: Polyphaga
- Infraorder: Scarabaeiformia
- Family: Scarabaeidae
- Genus: Schizonycha
- Species: S. rugifrons

Binomial name
- Schizonycha rugifrons Moser, 1914

Species of beetle

Schizonycha rugifrons is a species of beetle of the family Scarabaeidae. It is found in Uganda.

== Description ==
Adults reach a length of about 15 mm (0.59 in). They are similar to Schizonycha kolbei. The head is wrinkled and punctate, the clypeus keel is quite strongly projecting in the middle, and the anterior margin of the clypeus is not emarginate. The pronotum is of a similar shape to that of kolbei, but less tapered anteriorly. The surface is only moderately densely punctate, covered with deep, punctures somewhat more closely behind the anterior margin. An indistinct median line and the transverse ridge on both sides before the posterior margin are smooth. The lateral margins are weakly notched and setate, and the anterior and posterior angles are obtuse. The scutellum bears several punctures laterally. On the elytra, the strong punctures are slightly denser than on the pronotum and bear tiny scale-like setae. The pygidium is quite densely covered with large umbilical punctures and the spaces between the punctures are weakly wrinkled. The thorax, episterna, and hind coxae are sparsely pubescent. The abdomen bears a transverse row of setae and laterally extensive punctation, the punctures of which are covered with shorter or longer setae.
