= Schizonycha hermanni =

Scientific classification
- Kingdom: Animalia
- Phylum: Arthropoda
- Clade: Pancrustacea
- Class: Insecta
- Order: Coleoptera
- Suborder: Polyphaga
- Infraorder: Scarabaeiformia
- Family: Scarabaeidae
- Genus: Schizonycha
- Species: S. hermanni

Binomial name
- Schizonycha hermanni Brenske, 1898

Species of beetle

Schizonycha hermanni is a species of beetle of the family Scarabaeidae. It is found in Tanzania.

== Description ==
Adults reach a length of about 18 mm (0.71 in). They are similar to Schizonycha kolbei but the vertex lacks a sharp transverse keel, the head is larger, the anterior margin of the pronotum is only very narrowly bordered, even narrower than in kolbei and without constriction there. The anterior angles are broadly rounded. The punctures of the pronotum and elytra are coarser, more wrinkled with minute hairs. The pygidium apex is smooth, and strongly margined.
