= Schizonycha kolbei =

Scientific classification
- Kingdom: Animalia
- Phylum: Arthropoda
- Clade: Pancrustacea
- Class: Insecta
- Order: Coleoptera
- Suborder: Polyphaga
- Infraorder: Scarabaeiformia
- Family: Scarabaeidae
- Genus: Schizonycha
- Species: S. kolbei

Binomial name
- Schizonycha kolbei Brenske, 1897

Species of beetle

Schizonycha kolbei is a species of beetle of the family Scarabaeidae. It is found in Tanzania.

== Description ==
Adults reach a length of about 18 mm (0.71 in). They are chestnut-brown and glossy, with tiny hairs in the punctures of the upper surface.
