= Schizonycha crinita =

Scientific classification
- Kingdom: Animalia
- Phylum: Arthropoda
- Clade: Pancrustacea
- Class: Insecta
- Order: Coleoptera
- Suborder: Polyphaga
- Infraorder: Scarabaeiformia
- Family: Scarabaeidae
- Genus: Schizonycha
- Species: S. crinita

Binomial name
- Schizonycha crinita Brenske, 1898

Species of beetle

Schizonycha crinita is a species of beetle of the family Scarabaeidae. It is found in South Africa (Western Cape).

== Description ==
Adults reach a length of about 15–16 mm (0.59–0.63 in). They are similar to Schizonycha ciliata, but the punctures on the head are less rugose, the pronotum has a transverse band of minute scabrose punctures along the anterior margin only, the other punctures are round and not very closely set, and the sides of the pronotum, the basal part of the elytra, and the whole pectus have a conspicuously long flavescent pubescence. The colour is also much lighter, the elytra and underside are somewhat testaceous.
