= Schizonycha comosa =

Scientific classification
- Kingdom: Animalia
- Phylum: Arthropoda
- Clade: Pancrustacea
- Class: Insecta
- Order: Coleoptera
- Suborder: Polyphaga
- Infraorder: Scarabaeiformia
- Family: Scarabaeidae
- Genus: Schizonycha
- Species: S. comosa

Binomial name
- Schizonycha comosa Burmeister, 1855

Species of beetle

Schizonycha comosa is a species of beetle of the family Scarabaeidae. It is found in South Africa (Western Cape, Eastern Cape).

== Description ==
Adults reach a length of about 15.5–16 mm (0.61–0.63 in). They are very similar to Schizonycha ciliata, but the shape of the genital armature is different. Also, the clypeus is more deeply sinuate in front and on the pronotum, the punctures are not so plainly asperous, and the median smooth longitudinal line is more distinct, especially in females. The pygidium is much less closely punctured, not coriaceous in the basal part and has there a median longitudinal impunctate space in males, but not in females.
