= Schizonycha ciliata =

Scientific classification
- Kingdom: Animalia
- Phylum: Arthropoda
- Clade: Pancrustacea
- Class: Insecta
- Order: Coleoptera
- Suborder: Polyphaga
- Infraorder: Scarabaeiformia
- Family: Scarabaeidae
- Genus: Schizonycha
- Species: S. ciliata

Binomial name
- Schizonycha ciliata Burmeister, 1855

Species of beetle

Schizonycha ciliata is a species of beetle of the family Scarabaeidae. It is found in South Africa (Northern Cape).

== Description ==
Adults reach a length of about 20.5–23 mm (0.81–0.91 in). The head and pronotum are chestnut-brown, while the elytra and under side are shining, ferruginous-red. They are glabrous on the upper side, but have a fringe of not closely set setae along the outer margin of the pronotum and elytra. Females may be distinguished from males by the punctures on the elytra, which are rounder and a little more shallow.
