= Schizonycha schoutedeni =

Scientific classification
- Kingdom: Animalia
- Phylum: Arthropoda
- Clade: Pancrustacea
- Class: Insecta
- Order: Coleoptera
- Suborder: Polyphaga
- Infraorder: Scarabaeiformia
- Family: Scarabaeidae
- Genus: Schizonycha
- Species: S. schoutedeni

Binomial name
- Schizonycha schoutedeni Moser, 1914

Species of beetle

Schizonycha schoutedeni is a species of beetle of the family Scarabaeidae. It is found in the Democratic Republic of the Congo.

== Description ==
Adults reach a length of about 21 mm (0.83 in). They are similar to Schizonycha aspera in shape. The pronotum is wider than long and sparsely covered with coarse, short-bristled punctures. The lateral margins are notched, and the anterior and posterior angles are obtuse. A smooth median line is indicated, and the ridge before the posterior margin is smooth, unlike in aspera. The scutellum is punctate only laterally. On the elytra, the punctures are bolder than in aspera, their setae are minute, and the spaces between the punctures are weakly wrinkled. The umbilical, short-bristled punctures on the pygidium are moderately dense or widely spaced. The thorax, episterna, and hind coxae are covered with yellowish hairs.
