= Schizonycha aspera =

Scientific classification
- Kingdom: Animalia
- Phylum: Arthropoda
- Clade: Pancrustacea
- Class: Insecta
- Order: Coleoptera
- Suborder: Polyphaga
- Infraorder: Scarabaeiformia
- Family: Scarabaeidae
- Genus: Schizonycha
- Species: S. aspera

Binomial name
- Schizonycha aspera Brenske, 1898

Species of beetle

Schizonycha aspera is a species of beetle of the family Scarabaeidae. It is found in the Democratic Republic of the Congo and Ivory Coast.

== Description ==
Adults reach a length of about 21 mm (0.83 in). They clypeus is very short, distinctly emarginate anteriorly, with the frontal keel fine, widely divided from the frontal suture, the frons smooth behind, then dully punctate, the vertex keel very finely demarcated. The pronotum is short, evenly rounded anteriorly, not deeply emarginate, the anterior margin granularly rough, the anterior angles sharp, the sides moderately curved outwards, the margin widely crenate anteriorly, the surface rather densely, very granularly rough punctate, without hairs. The elytra are more densely and much more finely punctate than the pronotum, with very minute white punctures. The pygidium is short, broadly rounded, densely and finely punctate. The abdomen is rather densely, finely, slightly granularly punctate, without hairs.
