= Schizonycha deserta =

Scientific classification
- Kingdom: Animalia
- Phylum: Arthropoda
- Clade: Pancrustacea
- Class: Insecta
- Order: Coleoptera
- Suborder: Polyphaga
- Infraorder: Scarabaeiformia
- Family: Scarabaeidae
- Genus: Schizonycha
- Species: S. deserta

Binomial name
- Schizonycha deserta Moser, 1914

Species of beetle

Schizonycha deserta is a species of beetle of the family Scarabaeidae. It is found in Uganda.

== Description ==
Adults reach a length of about 12 mm (0.47 in). They are similar to Schizonycha eremita. They are reddish-yellow, with the head, pronotum and legs red. The head is somewhat wrinkled and punctate, the clypeus keel is strong and quite strongly curved forward and the anterior margin of the clypeus shows hardly any trace of a bulge. The pronotum is twice as wide as it is long and sparsely punctate and the transverse ridge on both sides before the posterior margin is smooth. The lateral margins are notched and the anterior and posterior angles are obtuse. The scutellum is sparsely punctate. On the elytra, the extremely minutely bristle-bearing punctures are moderately dense, and on the pygidium, they are quite widely spaced.
