= Schizonycha eremita =

Scientific classification
- Kingdom: Animalia
- Phylum: Arthropoda
- Clade: Pancrustacea
- Class: Insecta
- Order: Coleoptera
- Suborder: Polyphaga
- Infraorder: Scarabaeiformia
- Family: Scarabaeidae
- Genus: Schizonycha
- Species: S. eremita

Binomial name
- Schizonycha eremita Brenske, 1898

Species of beetle

Schizonycha eremita is a species of beetle of the family Scarabaeidae. It is found in Sierra Leone.

== Description ==
Adults reach a length of about 12.5 mm (0.49 in). They have a narrow, cylindrical body. The clypeus is weakly rounded. The pronotum is mildly transverse, more straight on the sides, deep and coarsely punctured. Here and on the elytra covered with very fine scales. The pygidium is rounded, convex, shiny, and dully punctate. The thorax is covered with whitish hairs.
