= Schizonycha amoena =

Scientific classification
- Kingdom: Animalia
- Phylum: Arthropoda
- Clade: Pancrustacea
- Class: Insecta
- Order: Coleoptera
- Suborder: Polyphaga
- Infraorder: Scarabaeiformia
- Family: Scarabaeidae
- Genus: Schizonycha
- Species: S. amoena

Binomial name
- Schizonycha amoena Brenske, 1898

Species of beetle

Schizonycha amoena is a species of beetle of the family Scarabaeidae. It is found in Senegal.

== Description ==
Adults reach a length of about 14–15 mm (0.55–0.59 in). They are very similar to Schizonycha aschantica and can only be distinguished from it by the shape of the hairs and scales. On the elytra, the tiny hairs are finer and on the sides of the abdomen, the scale-like hairs are narrower. On the thorax, only on the posterior part are there narrow white scale-like hairs, which merge completely into hairs at the front, even more so in males than in females.
