= Schizonycha aschantica =

Scientific classification
- Kingdom: Animalia
- Phylum: Arthropoda
- Clade: Pancrustacea
- Class: Insecta
- Order: Coleoptera
- Suborder: Polyphaga
- Infraorder: Scarabaeiformia
- Family: Scarabaeidae
- Genus: Schizonycha
- Species: S. aschantica

Binomial name
- Schizonycha aschantica Brenske, 1898

Species of beetle

Schizonycha aschantica is a species of beetle of the family Scarabaeidae. It is found in Ghana.

== Description ==
Adults reach a length of about 13–14 mm (0.51–0.55 in). They are shiny, brown and slender. The pronotum is laterally somewhat more distinctly covered with small scale-like hairs, the margin finely toothed. The elytra are uniformly, weakly wrinkled with small scale-like hairs. The pygidium likewise, with a narrow longitudinal stripe. On the abdomen, the fine scales are somewhat more distinct laterally, with a row of weak setae on each segment.
