= Schizonycha gonaquoides =

Scientific classification
- Kingdom: Animalia
- Phylum: Arthropoda
- Clade: Pancrustacea
- Class: Insecta
- Order: Coleoptera
- Suborder: Polyphaga
- Infraorder: Scarabaeiformia
- Family: Scarabaeidae
- Genus: Schizonycha
- Species: S. gonaquoides

Binomial name
- Schizonycha gonaquoides Pope, 1960

Species of beetle

Schizonycha gonaquoides is a species of beetle of the family Scarabaeidae. It is found in South Africa (Northern Cape).

== Description ==
Adults reach a length of about 13 mm (0.51 in). They are almost indistinguishable from Schizonycha gonaqua, other than by the male genitalia.
