= Schizonycha gonaqua =

Scientific classification
- Kingdom: Animalia
- Phylum: Arthropoda
- Clade: Pancrustacea
- Class: Insecta
- Order: Coleoptera
- Suborder: Polyphaga
- Infraorder: Scarabaeiformia
- Family: Scarabaeidae
- Genus: Schizonycha
- Species: S. gonaqua

Binomial name
- Schizonycha gonaqua Péringuey, 1904

Species of beetle

Schizonycha gonaqua is a species of beetle of the family Scarabaeidae. It is found in South Africa (Northern Cape).

== Description ==
Adults reach a length of about 12 mm (0.47 in). They are ferruginous-red, with the club of the antennae flavescent. The clypeus and frontal part are deeply punctured, with the space behind the basal carina smooth. The pronotum is covered in the anterior part with scabrose, distinct closely set punctures, a little less scattered and non-scabrose in the posterior discoidal part, in the centre there is a not very distinct longitudinal band and the supra-basal impunctate folds are smooth very plain. The scutellum is punctate laterally. The elytra have deep, equi-distant punctures, and the hairs are very minute. The pygidium is deeply and closely punctate all over.
