= Schizonycha capensis =

Scientific classification
- Kingdom: Animalia
- Phylum: Arthropoda
- Clade: Pancrustacea
- Class: Insecta
- Order: Coleoptera
- Suborder: Polyphaga
- Infraorder: Scarabaeiformia
- Family: Scarabaeidae
- Genus: Schizonycha
- Species: S. capensis

Binomial name
- Schizonycha capensis Burmeister, 1855

Synonyms
- Schizonycha fraudulenta Péringuey, 1904

Species of beetle

Schizonycha capensis is a species of beetle of the family Scarabaeidae. It is found in South Africa (Cape).

== Description ==
Adults reach a length of about 15.5–16 mm (0.61–0.63 in). They are similar to Schizonycha tumida in shape, size, colour, and sculpture.
