= Schizonycha tumida =

Scientific classification
- Kingdom: Animalia
- Phylum: Arthropoda
- Clade: Pancrustacea
- Class: Insecta
- Order: Coleoptera
- Suborder: Polyphaga
- Infraorder: Scarabaeiformia
- Family: Scarabaeidae
- Genus: Schizonycha
- Species: S. tumida

Binomial name
- Schizonycha tumida (Laporte, 1840)

Synonyms
- Rhizotrogus tumidus Laporte, 1840

Species of beetle

Schizonycha tumida is a species of beetle of the family Scarabaeidae. It is found in South Africa (Northern Cape, Western Cape) and Tanzania.

== Description ==
Adults reach a length of about 15–17 mm (0.59–0.67 in). They are chestnut-brown, with the elytra a little redder and the head slightly darker than the pronotum. The club of the antennae is flavescent. They have a very small white hair in each puncture.
