= Schizonycha salaama =

Scientific classification
- Kingdom: Animalia
- Phylum: Arthropoda
- Clade: Pancrustacea
- Class: Insecta
- Order: Coleoptera
- Suborder: Polyphaga
- Infraorder: Scarabaeiformia
- Family: Scarabaeidae
- Genus: Schizonycha
- Species: S. salaama

Binomial name
- Schizonycha salaama Brenske, 1898

Species of beetle

Schizonycha salaama is a species of beetle of the family Scarabaeidae. It is found in Tanzania and Mozambique.

== Description ==
Adults reach a length of about 14.5–15 mm (0.57–0.59 in). They are castaneous and shining and very similar to Schizonycha abenaba.
