= Schizonycha abenaba =

Scientific classification
- Kingdom: Animalia
- Phylum: Arthropoda
- Clade: Pancrustacea
- Class: Insecta
- Order: Coleoptera
- Suborder: Polyphaga
- Infraorder: Scarabaeiformia
- Family: Scarabaeidae
- Genus: Schizonycha
- Species: S. abenaba

Binomial name
- Schizonycha abenaba Pope, 1960

Species of beetle

Schizonycha abenaba is a species of beetle of the family Scarabaeidae. It is found in Namibia.

== Description ==
Adults reach a length of about 16.5 mm (0.65 in). They are testaceous with the head and pronotum somewhat redder.
