= Schizonycha longula =

Scientific classification
- Kingdom: Animalia
- Phylum: Arthropoda
- Clade: Pancrustacea
- Class: Insecta
- Order: Coleoptera
- Suborder: Polyphaga
- Infraorder: Scarabaeiformia
- Family: Scarabaeidae
- Genus: Schizonycha
- Species: S. longula

Binomial name
- Schizonycha longula Moser, 1914

Species of beetle

Schizonycha longula is a species of beetle of the family Scarabaeidae. It is found in Tanzania.

== Description ==
Adults reach a length of about 15 mm (0.59 in). They are similar to Schizonycha angustata. The head is punctured, with the punctures bristled. The clypeus keel is curved forward in the middle, the anterior margin of the clypeus is barely notably emarginate. The pronotum is of a similar shape to that of angustata, slightly more densely punctured, and with the setae and punctures much finer. The transverse ridge on both sides before the posterior margin is smooth. The scutellum is covered with bristled punctures. On the weakly wrinkled elytra, the punctures are somewhat more widely spaced than on the pronotum and the white setae are even finer, almost hair-like. The pygidium is moderately densely covered with umbilical punctures, which bear white, barely bristle-like hairs. The thorax, episterna, and hind coxae are fairly densely punctured, the punctures bearing white setae.
