= Schizonycha deceptor =

Scientific classification
- Kingdom: Animalia
- Phylum: Arthropoda
- Clade: Pancrustacea
- Class: Insecta
- Order: Coleoptera
- Suborder: Polyphaga
- Infraorder: Scarabaeiformia
- Family: Scarabaeidae
- Genus: Schizonycha
- Species: S. deceptor

Binomial name
- Schizonycha deceptor Pope, 1960

Species of beetle

Schizonycha deceptor is a species of beetle of the family Scarabaeidae. It is found in South Africa (Free State, Northern Cape).

== Description ==
Adults reach a length of about 14–14.5 mm (0.55–0.57 in). They are very similar to Schizonycha abrupta, but smaller and reddish testaceous in colour, as well as moderately shining. Furthermore, the pronotum has the discal punctures slightly more widely spaced and the elytra are a little more sparsely and less regularly punctured.
