= Schizonycha fatidica =

Scientific classification
- Kingdom: Animalia
- Phylum: Arthropoda
- Clade: Pancrustacea
- Class: Insecta
- Order: Coleoptera
- Suborder: Polyphaga
- Infraorder: Scarabaeiformia
- Family: Scarabaeidae
- Genus: Schizonycha
- Species: S. fatidica

Binomial name
- Schizonycha fatidica Péringuey, 1904

Species of beetle

Schizonycha fatidica is a species of beetle of the family Scarabaeidae. It is found in South Africa (Eastern Cape).

== Description ==
Adults reach a length of about 16–19 mm (0.63–0.75 in). They are similar to Schizonycha rugosa, but the clypeus has a sinuate anterior edge, the pronotum has scabrose punctures along the anterior margin only (while the rest of the punctures are cicatricose) and there is an elongate median smooth space on the pronotal disc.
