= Schizonycha marginata =

Scientific classification
- Kingdom: Animalia
- Phylum: Arthropoda
- Clade: Pancrustacea
- Class: Insecta
- Order: Coleoptera
- Suborder: Polyphaga
- Infraorder: Scarabaeiformia
- Family: Scarabaeidae
- Genus: Schizonycha
- Species: S. marginata

Binomial name
- Schizonycha marginata Pope, 1960

Species of beetle

Schizonycha marginata is a species of beetle of the family Scarabaeidae. It is found in Namibia.

== Description ==
Adults reach a length of about 10–10.5 mm (0.39–0.41 in). They are very similar to Schizonycha windhoekensis, but the head is more sharply angled, the anterior border of the pronotum is less strongly sinuate laterally and the setae along the lateral borders of the elytra are more sparsely arranged.
