= Schizonycha inops =

Scientific classification
- Kingdom: Animalia
- Phylum: Arthropoda
- Clade: Pancrustacea
- Class: Insecta
- Order: Coleoptera
- Suborder: Polyphaga
- Infraorder: Scarabaeiformia
- Family: Scarabaeidae
- Genus: Schizonycha
- Species: S. inops

Binomial name
- Schizonycha inops Péringuey, 1904

Species of beetle

Schizonycha inops is a species of beetle of the family Scarabaeidae. It is found in Namibia.

== Description ==
Adults reach a length of about 12 mm (0.47 in). They are nearly identical to of Schizonycha divulsa, but the squamulose hairs of the pronotum are slightly thicker and but the genital armature of the two species differs considerably.
