= List of Trechus species =

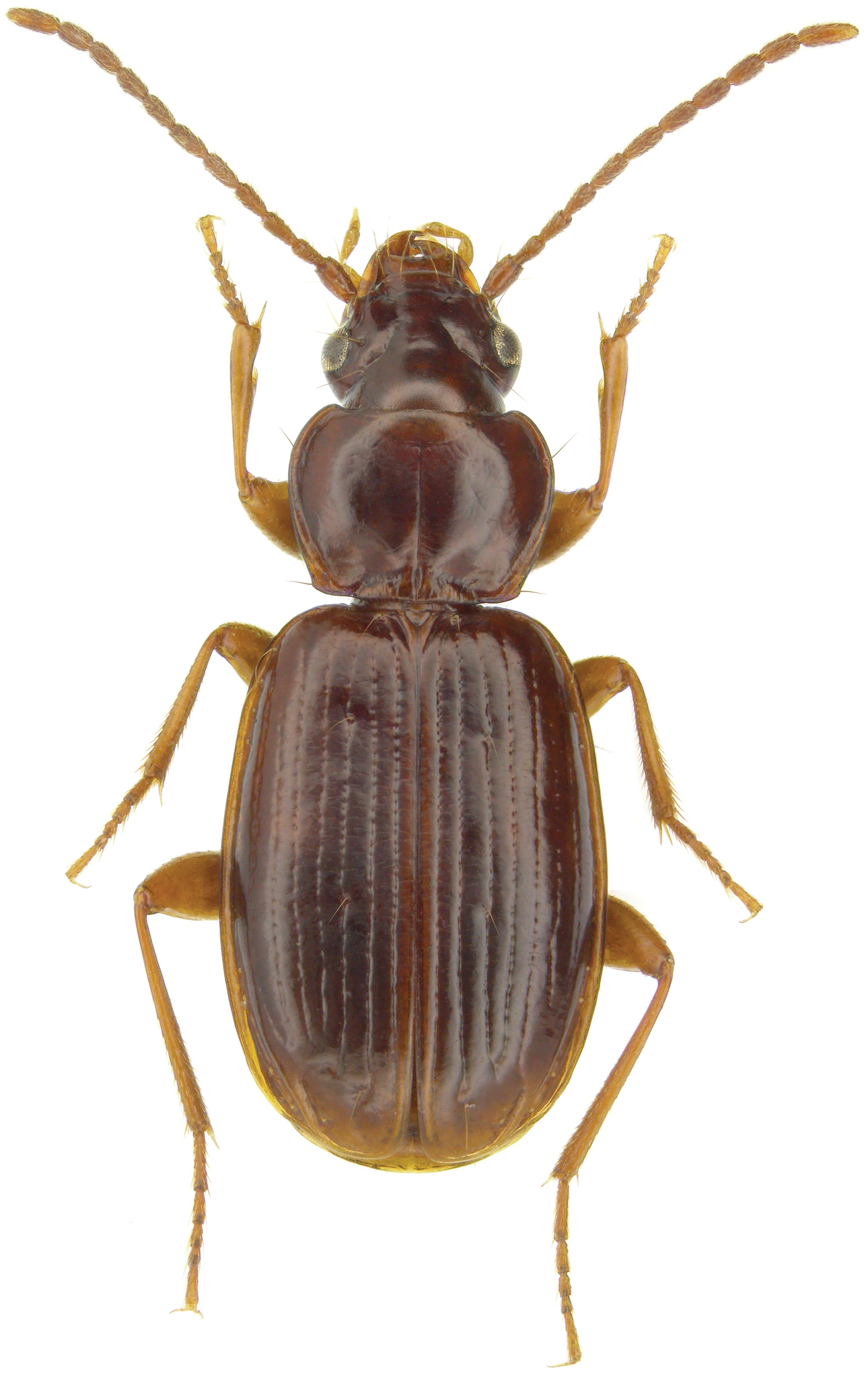
Trechus apicalis

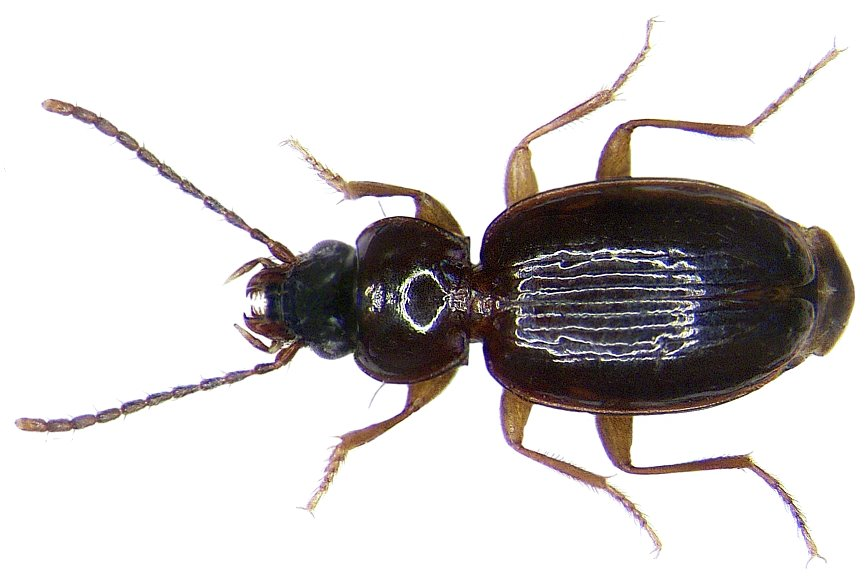
Trechus splendens

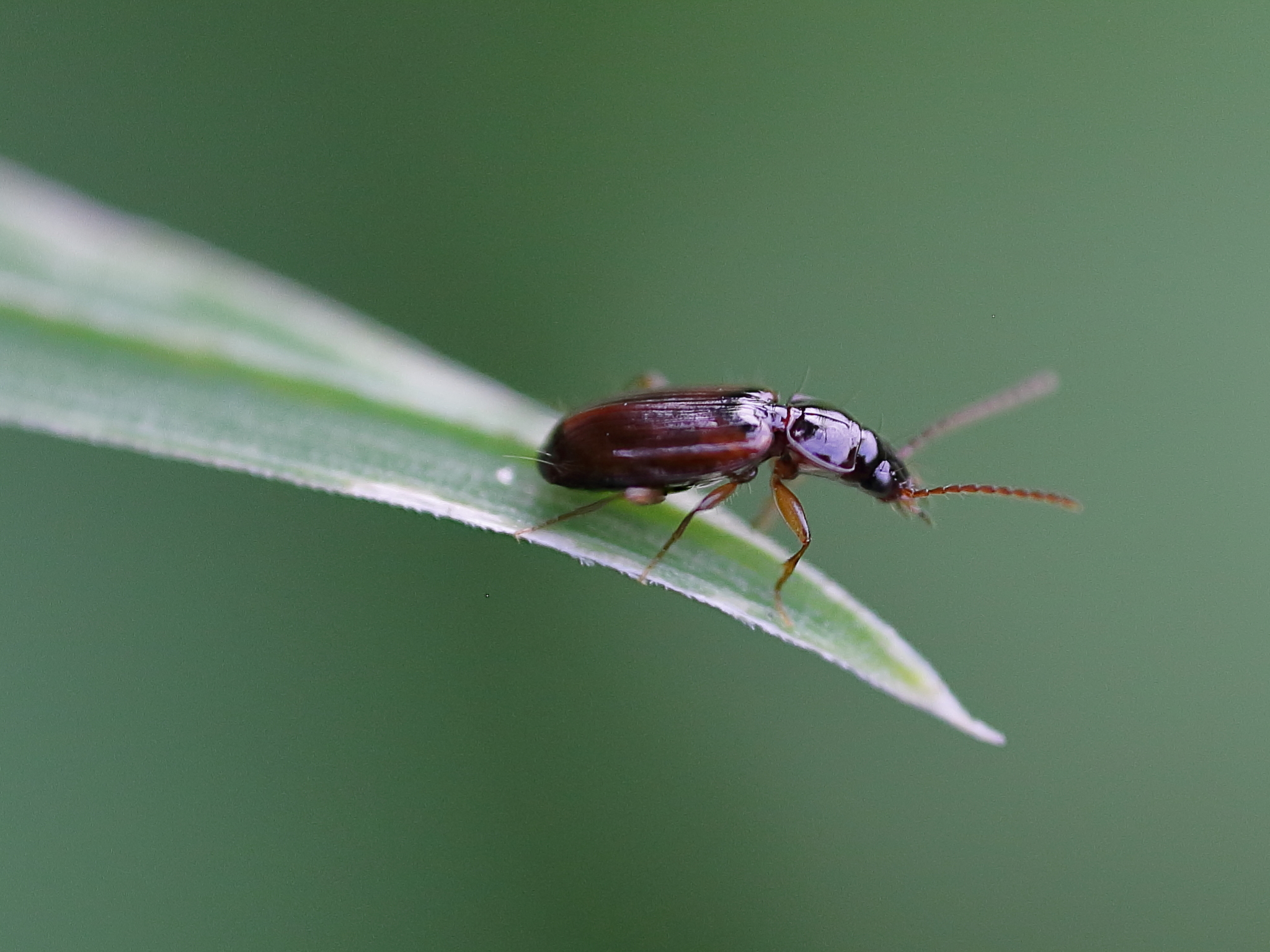
Trechus quadristriatus, Germany

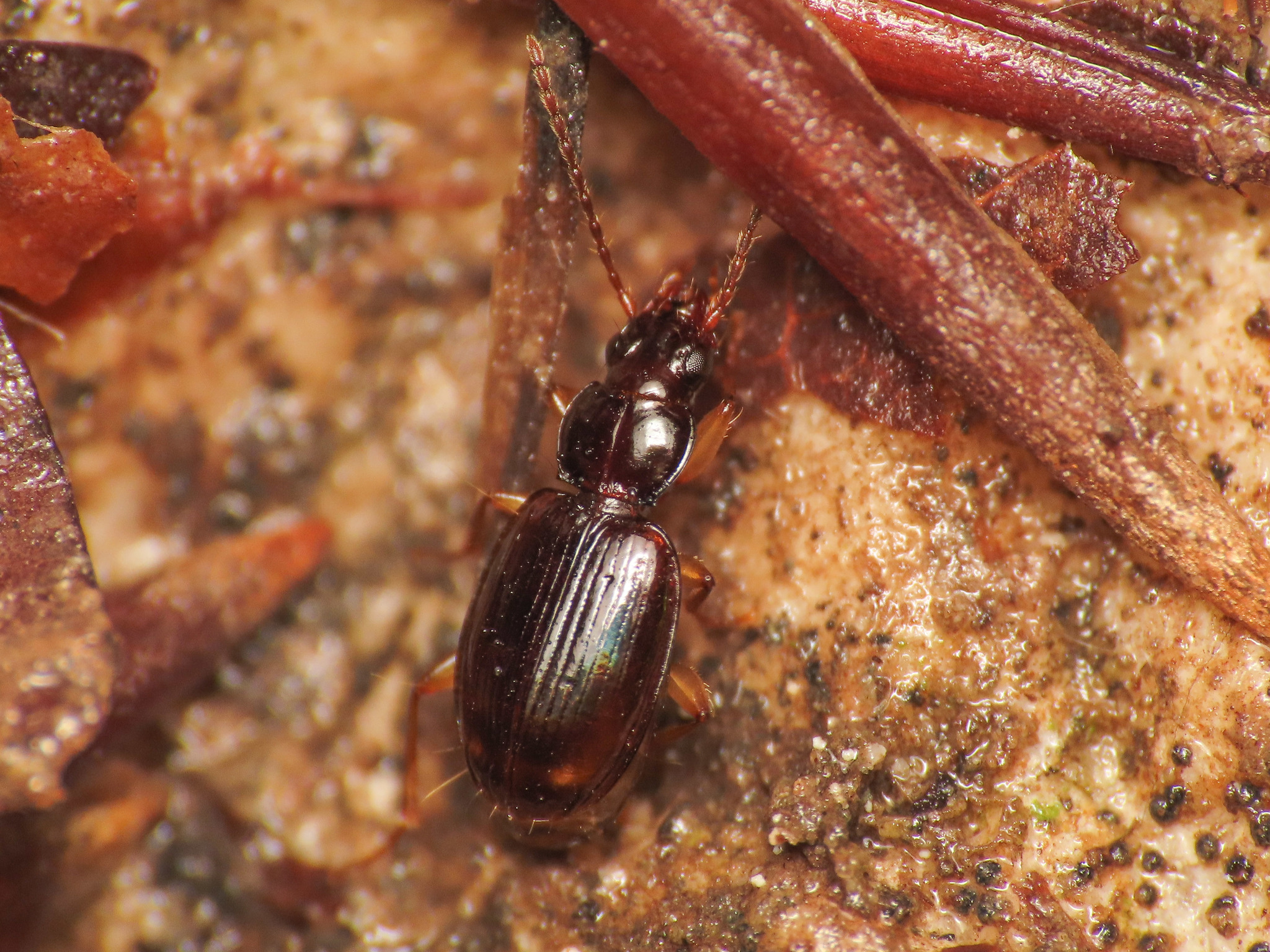
Trechus binotatus, Italy

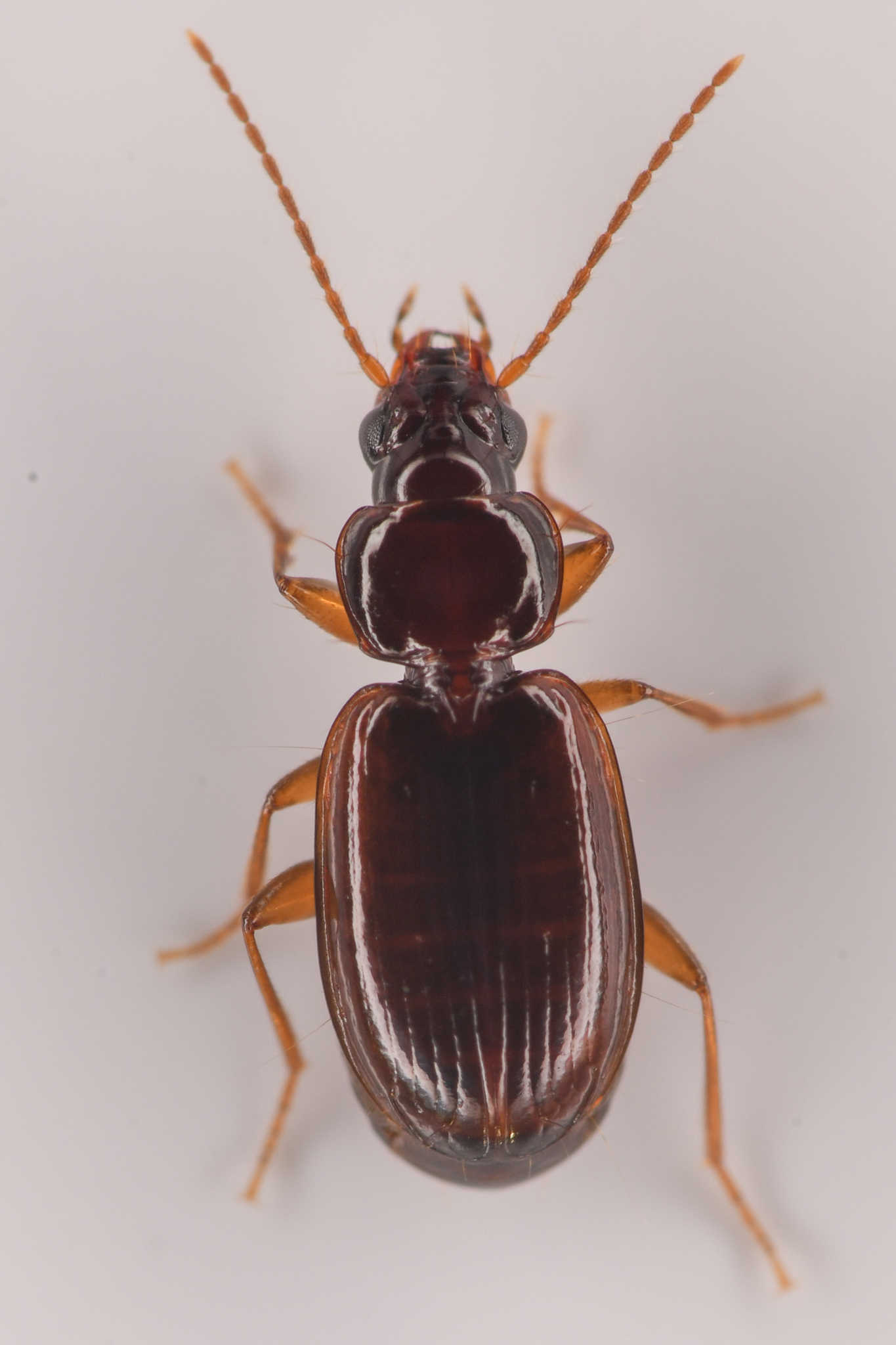
Trechus obtusus, California

This is a list of species in Trechus, a genus of beetles in the family Carabidae.

The genus Trechus contains the following species:

== A ==
- Trechus abakumovi Belousov & Kabak, 1996
- Trechus abalkhasimi J.Schmidt & Faille, 2018
- Trechus abdurakhmanovi Belousov, 1990
- Trechus abeillei Pandellé, 1872
- Trechus academiae Deuve, 1992
- Trechus achillecasalei Deuve, 1998
- Trechus acuticollis Sciaky & Pavesi, 1994
- Trechus adaba J.Schmidt & Faille, 2018
- Trechus additus J.Schmidt, 2016
- Trechus aduncus Barr, 1962
- Trechus adustus Jeannel, 1962
- Trechus aedeagalis J.Schmidt, 2009
- Trechus aethiopicus Alluaud, 1918
- Trechus aghiazicus Belousov & Kabak, 2019
- Trechus agni Deuve & Queinnec, 1985
- Trechus agouzicus Deuve & Queinnec, 1992
- Trechus akibensis Belousov, 1990
- Trechus akkusianus Donabauer, 2006
- Trechus aksuensis Belousov & Kabak, 1996
- Trechus alajensis Belousov & Kabak, 1994
- Trechus alanicus Belousov, 1990
- Trechus albanicus Apfelbeck, 1905
- Trechus algiricus Jeannel, 1922
- Trechus alicantinus Español, 1971
- Trechus alinae Dajoz, 1990
- Trechus almonius Reitter, 1903
- Trechus alpicola Sturm, 1825
- Trechus alpigradus Reitter, 1888
- Trechus alticola Wollaston, 1854
- Trechus altitudinum Deuve, 2004
- Trechus amasraensis Donabauer, 2004
- Trechus ambarasensis Jeannel, 1954
- Trechus amblus Jeannel, 1935
- Trechus amblygonellus Jeannel, 1964
- Trechus amblygonus Jeannel, 1935
- Trechus ambrolauricus Belousov, 1989
- Trechus amharicus Ortuño & Novoa, 2011
- Trechus amicorum P.Moravec & Wrase, 1998
- Trechus amplicollis Fairmaire, 1859
- Trechus anae Morvan, 1982
- Trechus andreinii Jeannel, 1921
- Trechus angavoensis J.Schmidt & Faille, 2018
- Trechus angelae Magrini, 1984
- Trechus angelicae Reitter, 1892
- Trechus angulifer Belousov & Kabak, 1992
- Trechus angusticeps Apfelbeck, 1904
- Trechus angusticollis Kiesenwetter, 1850
- Trechus anichtchenkoi Toribio, 2012
- Trechus animosus Jeannel, 1962
- Trechus anjuensis Deuve, 1998
- Trechus antonii Jeannel, 1936
- Trechus antonini Deuve, 1998
- Trechus apache Dajoz, 1990
- Trechus apicalis Motschulsky, 1845
- Trechus apoduvalipenis Salgado & Ortuño, 1998
- Trechus apusenicus P.Moravec, 1986
- Trechus aquilus Jeannel, 1962
- Trechus arambourgi Jeannel, 1935
- Trechus arizonae Casey, 1918
- Trechus armenus Iablokoff-Khnzorian, 1963
- Trechus arnoldii Belousov, 1987
- Trechus arrecheai Ortuño; Gilgado & Cuesta, 2014
- Trechus arribasi Jeanne, 1988
- Trechus arshanicus Belousov & Kabak, 2001
- Trechus artemisiae Putzeys, 1872
- Trechus arthuri P.Moravec & Lompe in Löbl & Smetana, 2003
- Trechus asiaticus Jeannel, 1927
- Trechus assingi Lompe, 1999
- Trechus astrophilus J.Schmidt, 2009
- Trechus atomus P.Moravec & Wrase, 1998
- Trechus aubei Pandellé, 1867
- Trechus aubryi Coiffait, 1953
- Trechus aurouxi (Mateu & Comas, 2006)
- Trechus austriacus Dejean, 1831
- Trechus avgolensis Belousov & Kabak, 1998
- Trechus aztec Jeannel, 1920

== B ==
- Trechus babaensis Lompe, 2015
- Trechus babaulti Jeannel, 1935
- Trechus babinjensis Jeannel, 1927
- Trechus badius Jeannel, 1960
- Trechus badzhalicus Plutenko, 2004
- Trechus bajankoli Belousov & Kabak, 1992
- Trechus bakeri Jeannel, 1923
- Trechus bakurovi Shilenkov, 1984
- Trechus baleensis (Basilewsky, 1974)
- Trechus balesilvestris J.Schmidt & Faille, 2018
- Trechus balfourbrownei Ueno, 1965
- Trechus balkaricus Belousov, 1990
- Trechus balsamensis Barr, 1962
- Trechus bannaticus Dejean, 1831
- Trechus barahbisensis Deuve, 1988
- Trechus barbaritae Donabauer, 2004
- Trechus barberi (Jeannel, 1931)
- Trechus barii Focarile, 1949
- Trechus barnevillei Pandellé, 1867
- Trechus barratxinai Español, 1971
- Trechus basarukini P.Moravec & Wrase, 1997
- Trechus basilewskianus Geginat, 2008
- Trechus basilewskyi Jeannel, 1960
- Trechus baskonicus Belousov & Kabak, 1996
- Trechus bastianinii Magrini & Sciaky, 2006
- Trechus bastropi J.Schmidt, 2009
- Trechus batuensis Magrini & Sciaky, 2006
- Trechus batyr Belousov & Kabak, 1992
- Trechus bayanbulak Deuve, 1993
- Trechus baztanensis Dupré, 1991
- Trechus beatus Reitter, 1903
- Trechus bedeli Jeannel, 1922
- Trechus beesoni Jeannel, 1930
- Trechus beghinorum Belousov & Kabak, 1992
- Trechus beieri Winkler, 1936
- Trechus belovi Belousov & Kabak, 1996
- Trechus beltrani Toribio, 1990
- Trechus benahoaritus Machado, 1989
- Trechus benesi Deuve, 1993
- Trechus bensai Jeannel, 1927
- Trechus besucheti Pawlowski, 1977
- Trechus besuchetianus Deuve, 1987
- Trechus beusti (L.Schaufuss, 1863)
- Trechus bhadarwahensis Deuve, 1982
- Trechus bhutanicus Ueno, 1977
- Trechus bianericus Belousov & Kabak, 2020
- Trechus bibulus Lompe, 1999
- Trechus biharicus Meixner, 1912
- Trechus binotatus Putzeys, 1870
- Trechus bipartitus Raffray, 1886
- Trechus bodemeyeri Reitter, 1913
- Trechus bogatshevi Belousov, 1987
- Trechus bogdani Belousov & Kabak, 2000
- Trechus bogdoensis Belousov & Kabak, 2001
- Trechus boghinorum Belousov & Kabak, 1992
- Trechus bohaci P.Moravec, 1987
- Trechus bohemorum Pawlowski, 1973
- Trechus boleslavi Belousov & Kabak, 2000
- Trechus boludagensis Donabauer, 2006
- Trechus bombi J.Schmidt & Faille, 2018
- Trechus bonvouloiri Pandellé, 1867
- Trechus bordei Peyerimhoff, 1909
- Trechus bosnicus Ganglbauer, 1891
- Trechus boudikae Morvan, 1982
- Trechus bouilloni Faille; Bourdeau & Fresneda, 2012
- Trechus boulbeni Deuve, 1998
- Trechus bourdeaui Fresneda; Valenzuela & Faille, 2015
- Trechus bowlingi Barr, 1962
- Trechus bradycelliformis Csiki, 1906
- Trechus brancuccii Deuve, 2006
- Trechus brendelli Deuve, 2005
- Trechus breuili Jeannel, 1913
- Trechus breuningi Morvan, 1972
- Trechus brevicaudis Belousov & Kabak, 1993
- Trechus brevicorpus Belousov & Kabak, 1993
- Trechus brezinai Deuve & Queinnec, 1992
- Trechus bruckii Fairmaire, 1862
- Trechus bruckoides Faille; Bourdeau & Fresneda, 2012
- Trechus buahitensis Jeannel, 1954
- Trechus budhaensis J.Schmidt, 2009
- Trechus byzantinus Apfelbeck, 1901

== C ==
- Trechus cabrerai (Jeannel, 1936)
- Trechus calashensis Deuve, 1982
- Trechus caliginis Barr, 1985
- Trechus cameroni Jeannel, 1923
- Trechus cantalicus Fauvel, 1888
- Trechus cappadocicus Pawlowski, 1976
- Trechus caprai Jeannel, 1927
- Trechus cardioderus Putzeys, 1870
- Trechus carilloi Toribio & Rodriguez, 1997
- Trechus carnioliae G.Müller, 1921
- Trechus carolinae Schaeffer, 1901
- Trechus carpaticus Rybinski, 1902
- Trechus caspiricus Deuve, 1982
- Trechus catensis Donabauer, 2013
- Trechus cathaicus Sciaky & Pavesi, 1995
- Trechus caucasicus Chaudoir, 1846
- Trechus cautus Wollaston, 1854
- Trechus cavernicola J.Frivaldszky, 1881
- Trechus ceballosi Mateu, 1953
- Trechus centralis Nonveiller; Pavicevic & Popovic, 1994
- Trechus cephalonicus Winkler, 1914
- Trechus cephalotellus Belousov in Kryzhanovskij et al., 1995
- Trechus ceresai Binaghi, 1938
- Trechus chalybeus Dejean, 1831
- Trechus championi Jeannel, 1920
- Trechus changbaicola Deuve, 2017
- Trechus chappuisi Jeannel, 1935
- Trechus cheoahensis Donabauer, 2005
- Trechus chiguguanensis Belousov & Kabak, 2020
- Trechus chillalicus Jeannel, 1936
- Trechus chodjaii Morvan, 1974
- Trechus chokensis Pawlowski, 2002
- Trechus cholaensis Deuve, 1996
- Trechus chormaensis Deuve, 1993
- Trechus christinae J.Schmidt, 2016
- Trechus cifrianae Ortuño & Jimenez-Valverde, 2011
- Trechus clarkeianus (Basilewsky, 1974)
- Trechus claudiae Deuve, 1996
- Trechus clingmanensis Donabauer, 2005
- Trechus coelestis Sciaky & Pavesi, 1994
- Trechus colobus J.Schmidt & Faille, 2018
- Trechus coloradensis Schaeffer, 1915
- Trechus comasi Hernando, 2002
- Trechus compactulus Belousov & Kabak, 1996
- Trechus compsus Jeannel, 1935
- Trechus concinnus Tschitscherine, 1904
- Trechus concoloratus Lorenz, 1998
- Trechus conformis Jeannel, 1927
- Trechus confusatorius Deuve & Kaiser, 2009
- Trechus consobrinus K. & J.Daniel, 1898
- Trechus constrictus Schaum, 1860
- Trechus controversus Binaghi, 1959
- Trechus coweensis Barr, 1979
- Trechus crassiscapus Lindroth, 1955
- Trechus cratocephalus Belousov & Kabak, 2019
- Trechus croaticus Dejean, 1831
- Trechus croceus Fresneda; Valenzuela; Bourdeau & Faille, 2019
- Trechus crucifer Piochard de la Brûlerie, 1876
- Trechus cryobius Jeannel, 1935
- Trechus cryptophilus Belousov & Kabak, 1992
- Trechus culminicola Jeannel, 1936
- Trechus cumberlandus Barr, 1962
- Trechus cuniculorum Mequignon, 1921
- Trechus curticollis Fairmaire, 1866
- Trechus curvatilis Belousov & Kabak, 1998
- Trechus cuspis Belousov & Kabak, 2020
- Trechus custos Wollaston, 1854
- Trechus cyclomus Jeannel, 1954
- Trechus cyprinus Franz, 1987

== D ==
- Trechus dabanensis Sciaky & Pavesi, 1994
- Trechus dabanshanicola Deuve, 2011
- Trechus dacatraianus Deuve, 1996
- Trechus dakushitaicus Deuve, 2004
- Trechus damchungensis Deuve, 1998
- Trechus danieli Holdhaus, 1902
- Trechus daoensis Belousov & Kabak, 2001
- Trechus davanensis Sciaky & Pavesi, 1994
- Trechus davidiani Belousov, 1990
- Trechus davidwrasei Donabauer, 2007
- Trechus dayanae Assmann & Wrase, 2012
- Trechus debilis Wollaston, 1871
- Trechus decolor Jeannel, 1938
- Trechus degienensis Jeannel, 1954
- Trechus delarouzeei Pandellé, 1867
- Trechus delhermi Saulcy, 1880
- Trechus deliae Morvan, 1971
- Trechus demircapicus P.Moravec, 1986
- Trechus demissus Jeannel, 1962
- Trechus densicornis (Fischhuber, 1977)
- Trechus depressipenis Sciaky & Pavesi, 1995
- Trechus depressipennis J.Schmidt & Faille, 2018
- Trechus deqenensis Deuve, 2017
- Trechus detersus Wollaston, 1864
- Trechus dichrous Reitter, 1911
- Trechus diecki Putzeys, 1870
- Trechus dilizhanicus Belousov, 1989
- Trechus dilutus Wollaston, 1854
- Trechus dimorphicus Pawlowski, 2002
- Trechus diogenes Pawlowski, 1979
- Trechus dioscuricus Belousov, 1990
- Trechus distigma Kiesenwetter, 1851
- Trechus distinctus Fairmaire & Laboulbène, 1854
- Trechus djebalicus (Comas & Mateu, 2008)
- Trechus djebelgloubensis Quéinnec & Ollivier, 2013
- Trechus doderoi Jeannel, 1927
- Trechus dodola J.Schmidt & Faille, 2018
- Trechus dolomitanus Jeannel, 1931
- Trechus donabaueri Lebenbauer, 2004
- Trechus dongola J.Schmidt, 2016
- Trechus dongulaensis J.Schmidt, 2009
- Trechus dostali Donabauer, 2007
- Trechus dromai J.Schmidt, 2016
- Trechus dubitans Reitter, 1903
- Trechus dudkorum Belousov & Kabak, 1996
- Trechus dulat Belousov & Kabak, 1992
- Trechus dumitrescui Decou, 1959
- Trechus duvalioides Deuve, 2004
- Trechus dzermukensis Iablokoff-Khnzorian, 1963
- Trechus dzhalair Belousov & Kabak, 1994
- Trechus dzhungaricus Belousov & Kabak, 1992
- Trechus dzykhvensis Belousov, 1990

== E ==
- Trechus echarouxi Ollivier & Queinnec, 2011
- Trechus egorovi Belousov & Kabak, 1996
- Trechus egregius Jeannel, 1927
- Trechus elburzensis Morvan, 1974
- Trechus elegans Putzeys, 1847
- Trechus elgonicus Jeannel, 1930
- Trechus elongatulus Putzeys, 1870
- Trechus enedaphos Fresneda; Valenzuela; Bourdeau & Faille, 2019
- Trechus enigmaticus Coiffait, 1971
- Trechus enoploides Jeannel, 1954
- Trechus enoplus Jeannel, 1935
- Trechus epirotes Colas, 1957
- Trechus eremita J.Schmidt, 2009
- Trechus ericalis Magrini; Queinnec & Vigna Taglianti, 2013
- Trechus erythrostomus Deuve, 1987
- Trechus escalerae Abeille de Perrin, 1903
- Trechus espanyoli (Mateu & Escola, 2006)
- Trechus eutrechoides Deuve, 1992
- Trechus exilipenis Belousov & Kabak, 1994

== F ==
- Trechus fadriquei (Mateu & Escola, 2006)
- Trechus fairmairei Pandellé, 1867
- Trechus felix Wollaston, 1864
- Trechus ferghanicus Belousov & Kabak, 1992
- Trechus fischtensis Reitter, 1888
- Trechus fisehai J.Schmidt & Faille, 2018
- Trechus flavocinctus Jeannel, 1922
- Trechus flavocircumdatus Jeannel, 1922
- Trechus flavolimbatus Wollaston, 1863
- Trechus flavomarginatus Wollaston, 1854
- Trechus focarilei Monguzzi, 1998
- Trechus folwarcznyi Deuve, 1998
- Trechus fongondi Deuve & Queinnec, 1983
- Trechus fontinalis Rybinski, 1901
- Trechus fortimanus Reitter, 1903
- Trechus fortunatus Jeannel, 1927
- Trechus franzianus Mateu & Deuve, 1979
- Trechus franzschuberti Donabauer, 2006
- Trechus frater J.Schmidt, 2016
- Trechus frigophilus J.Schmidt, 2016
- Trechus fritzbeneschi Donabauer, 2006
- Trechus fubianensis Deuve, 2009
- Trechus fulvatilis Belousov & Kabak, 1998
- Trechus fulvus Dejean, 1831
- Trechus fusculus Motschulsky, 1850

== G ==
- Trechus gagrensis Jeannel, 1927
- Trechus galianus Belousov, 1989
- Trechus galicicaensis B.V.Gueorguiev & Hristovski, 2010
- Trechus gallaecus Jeannel, 1921
- Trechus gallorites Jeannel, 1936
- Trechus gamae Reboleira & Serrano, 2009
- Trechus gansuensis Deuve & Queinnec, 1993
- Trechus gemaensis Belousov & Kabak, 2020
- Trechus genevanorum Pawlowski, 1977
- Trechus gigas Pawlowski, 2002
- Trechus gigoni (Casale, 1982)
- Trechus gitzeni Belousov & Kabak, 2001
- Trechus glabratus J.Schmidt, 2009
- Trechus glacialis Heer, 1837
- Trechus glebi Belousov & Kabak, 2019
- Trechus gloriensis Jeanne, 1971
- Trechus goebli Breit, 1914
- Trechus goelkoeyensis Donabauer, 2013
- Trechus goidanichi Focarile & Casale, 1978
- Trechus goliath Belousov & Kabak, 1992
- Trechus golovatchi Casale, 1983
- Trechus gomerensis Franz, 1986
- Trechus gongshanensis Deuve & Kavanaugh, 2016
- Trechus gorkhai J.Schmidt, 1998
- Trechus gracilitarsis K. & J.Daniel, 1898
- Trechus gradloni Morvan, 1982
- Trechus grandiceps Reitter, 1885
- Trechus grandipennis J.Schmidt & Faille, 2018
- Trechus grandis Ganglbauer, 1891
- Trechus gravidus Putzeys, 1870
- Trechus grenieri Pandellé, 1867
- Trechus groubei (Antoine, 1936)
- Trechus guangaishanus Belousov & Kabak, 2001
- Trechus gugheensis Jeannel, 1950
- Trechus gulickai Löbl, 1967
- Trechus gurungi J.Schmidt, 1998
- Trechus gusevi Belousov, 1990
- Trechus gushensis Belousov & Kabak, 1998
- Trechus gwiomarchi Morvan, 1982
- Trechus gyalmo J.Schmidt, 2016
- Trechus gyalpo J.Schmidt, 2016
- Trechus gyatsola J.Schmidt, 2016
- Trechus gypaeti Vigna Taglianti & Magrini, 2009

== H ==
- Trechus habaicus Deuve, 2011
- Trechus habashanensis Deuve, 2017
- Trechus hagenia J.Schmidt & Faille, 2018
- Trechus haggei J.Schmidt & Faille, 2018
- Trechus hajeki Reitter, 1913
- Trechus hampei Ganglbauer, 1891
- Trechus hangaicus Shilenkov, 1982
- Trechus haoe Barr, 1979
- Trechus haoeleadensis Donabauer, 2005
- Trechus harenna J.Schmidt & Faille, 2018
- Trechus harryi J.Schmidt & Faille, 2018
- Trechus hauseri Jeannel, 1962
- Trechus heinzianus Pawlowski, 1979
- Trechus hemsinensis Donabauer, 2013
- Trechus hendrichsi Mateu, 1974
- Trechus heniochicus Ljovuschkin, 1970
- Trechus hiekei J.Schmidt, 2016
- Trechus himalensis Deuve & Queinnec, 1985
- Trechus hingstoni Jeannel, 1928
- Trechus hodeberti Deuve, 1998
- Trechus holzun Shilenkov & Sokolov, 1987
- Trechus hoppi Jeannel, 1927
- Trechus houzhenziensis Deuve, 2001
- Trechus howellae Barr, 1979
- Trechus humboldti Van Dyke, 1945
- Trechus hummleri Jeannel, 1927
- Trechus hurrita Pavesi & Sciaky, 1990
- Trechus huzhubeiensis Deuve, 2011
- Trechus hydropicus G.Horn, 1883
- Trechus hylonomellus Lorenz, 1998
- Trechus hyperythros Fresneda; Valenzuela; Bourdeau & Faille, 2019

== I ==
- Trechus iblanensis (Mateu & Escola, 2006)
- Trechus idriss Peyerimhoff, 1924
- Trechus ilgazensis Donabauer, 2004
- Trechus ilgazicus Pawlowski, 1976
- Trechus illyricus Jeannel, 1921
- Trechus imaicus Jeannel, 1923
- Trechus imereticus Belousov, 1990
- Trechus impunctus Casale, 1979
- Trechus imurai Ueno, 1999
- Trechus incisipenis Belousov & Kabak, 1999
- Trechus incola Peyerimhoff, 1909
- Trechus indicus Putzeys, 1870
- Trechus indicusoides Deuve, 2005
- Trechus inexpectatus Barr, 1985
- Trechus inexspectatus Belousov & Kabak, 2001
- Trechus infuscatus Chaudoir, 1850
- Trechus insolitus K.Daniel in K. & J.Daniel, 1906
- Trechus insubricus K. & J.Daniel, 1898
- Trechus iranicus Morvan & Pawlowski, 1977
- Trechus irenis Csiki, 1912
- Trechus iricolor Sciaky & Pavesi, 1995
- Trechus iridescens J.Schmidt & Faille, 2018
- Trechus irkeshtamicus Belousov & Kabak, 1998
- Trechus irritus Jeannel, 1960
- Trechus isabelae Borges & Serrano, 2007 (Cave ground-beetle)
- Trechus isfanensis Belousov & Kabak, 1998
- Trechus ispulensis Belousov & Kabak, 1992
- Trechus italicus K. & J.Daniel, 1898
- Trechus ithae Reitter, 1888

== J ==
- Trechus jadodraconis Deuve, 1995
- Trechus jaechi Donabauer, 2006
- Trechus janaki P.Moravec, 1993
- Trechus janatai Belousov & Kabak, 2000
- Trechus jarrigei Morvan, 1972
- Trechus jeannei Sciaky, 1998
- Trechus jezerensis Apfelbeck, 1908
- Trechus jiuhensis Deuve & Liang, 2015
- Trechus jiuzhaiensis Deuve, 1998
- Trechus jorgensis Oromi & Borges, 1991 (Cave ground-beetle)
- Trechus jugivagus Lutshnik, 1930

== K ==
- Trechus kabakovi Pawlowski, 1978
- Trechus kabylicus Casale, 1983
- Trechus kackardagi Pawlowski, 1978
- Trechus kaikanicus Belousov & Kabak, 1994
- Trechus kalabi Deuve & Queinnec, 1993
- Trechus kalabianus Deuve, 1993
- Trechus kangchenjunga J.Schmidt, 2016
- Trechus kantegiricus Belousov & Kabak, 1994
- Trechus karadenizus Pawlowski, 1976
- Trechus karasibensis Belousov & Kabak, 1994
- Trechus karlykensis Belousov & Kabak, 2001
- Trechus kashensis Belousov & Kabak, 2001
- Trechus kashgarensis Deuve, 1992
- Trechus kataevi Belousov, 1987
- Trechus katranicus Belousov & Kabak, 1996
- Trechus kaznakovi Jeannel, 1935
- Trechus keithi Ollivier; Pavicevic & Queinnec, 2008
- Trechus ketmenicus Belousov & Kabak, 1993
- Trechus kezadonicus Belousov, 1989
- Trechus khalabicus Belousov, 1990
- Trechus khaledicus Belousov, 1990
- Trechus khnzoriani Pawlowski, 1976
- Trechus khorgosicus Belousov & Kabak, 1994
- Trechus kiapazicus Belousov, 1990
- Trechus kimak Belousov & Kabak, 1996
- Trechus kobingeri Apfelbeck, 1902
- Trechus kocheri Paulian & Villiers, 1939
- Trechus kodoricus Belousov, 1989
- Trechus kokzhotensis Belousov & Kabak, 1996
- Trechus komarovi Belousov, 1990
- Trechus korae J.Schmidt, 2009
- Trechus korbi Reitter, 1903
- Trechus korotyaevi Shilenkov, 1982
- Trechus korrigani Morvan, 1982
- Trechus korzhun Belousov & Kabak, 1994
- Trechus kovali Belousov, 1989
- Trechus kozlovi Jeannel, 1935
- Trechus krasnovi Belousov & Kabak, 1992
- Trechus krejcii Deuve & Queinnec, 1985
- Trechus kricheldorffi Wagner, 1913
- Trechus kucerai Deuve, 2011
- Trechus kukunoricus Belousov & Kabak, 2000
- Trechus kulpensis Belousov & Kabak, 1998
- Trechus kuraicus Shilenkov, 1995
- Trechus kurbatovi Belousov & Kabak, 2000
- Trechus kurentzovi Lafer, 1989
- Trechus kurnakovi Jeannel, 1960
- Trechus kushtaicus Belousov & Kabak, 2001

== L ==
- Trechus labrangensis Belousov & Kabak, 2000
- Trechus labruleriei Jeannel, 1921
- Trechus laevipes Jeannel, 1927
- Trechus lailensis Belousov, 1989
- Trechus lallemantii Fairmaire, 1859
- Trechus lama J.Schmidt, 2009
- Trechus lamjunensis J.Schmidt, 1994
- Trechus lampros Jeannel, 1935
- Trechus laranoensis Lompe, 1999
- Trechus larisae Belousov & Kabak, 1996
- Trechus lassallei Deuve, 1981
- Trechus latebricola Kiesenwetter, 1850
- Trechus latibuli Jeannel, 1948
- Trechus latior Darlington, 1959
- Trechus latiplatus Belousov & Kabak, 1998
- Trechus latus Putzeys, 1847
- Trechus laureticola Jeannel, 1936
- Trechus lazicus Pawlowski, 1976
- Trechus lebenbaueri Donabauer, 2004
- Trechus lebretae Jeannel, 1960
- Trechus lederi Putzeys, 1878
- Trechus ledouxianus Mateu & Deuve, 1979
- Trechus legorskyi Donabauer, 2013
- Trechus leleupi Jeannel, 1954
- Trechus lencinai (Mateu & Ortuño, 2006)
- Trechus lepineyi Paulian & Villiers, 1939
- Trechus lepontinus Ganglbauer, 1891
- Trechus letshkhumicus Belousov, 1989
- Trechus levillaini Morvan, 1982
- Trechus lgockii Pawlowski, 1978
- Trechus lhasaensis J.Schmidt, 2016
- Trechus libanensis Piochard de la Brûlerie, 1876
- Trechus liguricus Jeannel, 1921
- Trechus lijiangensis Belousov & Kabak, 2001
- Trechus limacodes Dejean, 1831
- Trechus lindbergi Coiffait, 1962
- Trechus linxiaicus Deuve, 2005
- Trechus liochrous Jeannel, 1935
- Trechus liopleurus Chaudoir, 1850
- Trechus litangensis Deuve, 1995
- Trechus loebli Pawlowski, 1977
- Trechus loeblianus Deuve, 1988
- Trechus loeffleri Magrini & Sciaky, 2006
- Trechus lomakini Belousov & Kabak, 1994
- Trechus longicollis Meixner, 1912
- Trechus longulus K. & J.Daniel, 1898
- Trechus lucidus Jeannel, 1960
- Trechus luculentus Barr, 1962
- Trechus lunai Reboleira & Serrano, 2009
- Trechus lundbladi Jeannel, 1938
- Trechus luquensis Belousov & Kabak, 2000
- Trechus lusitanicus Jeannel, 1921
- Trechus luteolus Jeannel, 1960
- Trechus lutshniki Belousov, 1987
- Trechus luzhangensis Deuve & Liang, 2016

== M ==
- Trechus maceki Deuve, 1992
- Trechus machadoensis Franz, 1984
- Trechus machadoi Jeannel, 1941
- Trechus machardi Jeanne, 1976
- Trechus maculicornis Chaudoir, 1846
- Trechus maderensis Csiki, 1928
- Trechus magistrettii Focarile, 1949
- Trechus magniceps Reitter, 1898
- Trechus maisaicus Belousov & Kabak, 1994
- Trechus majusculus K.Daniel, 1902
- Trechus mallaszianus P.Moravec & Lompe in Löbl & Smetana, 2003
- Trechus mandarinus Sciaky & Pavesi, 1995
- Trechus manensis Belousov & Kabak, 1994
- Trechus manzhangicus Deuve, 2004
- Trechus maomao Deuve, 2005
- Trechus maoniu Belousov & Kabak, 2020
- Trechus maowenensis Deuve, 1995
- Trechus maqenicus Deuve, 2004
- Trechus maquensis Deuve, 2004
- Trechus marcilhaci Pham, 1987
- Trechus marcilhacianus Deuve, 2004
- Trechus margelanicus Belousov & Kabak, 1998
- Trechus marginalis Schaum in Kraatz, 1862
- Trechus maritimus Sainte-Claire Deville, 1907
- Trechus markakolensis Belousov & Kabak, 1999
- Trechus martelluccii Magrini & Sciaky, 2006
- Trechus martensi Deuve & Hodebert, 1991
- Trechus martinae J.Schmidt, 2009
- Trechus martinezi Jeannel, 1927
- Trechus matejkai Vsetecka, 1938
- Trechus mateui Deuve & Queinnec, 1985
- Trechus matrismeae Pawlowski, 1972
- Trechus mattisi J.Schmidt & Faille, 2018
- Trechus mauritanicus Jeannel, 1909
- Trechus meissonnieri Belousov & Kabak, 2000
- Trechus meixnerianus P.Moravec & Lompe in Löbl & Smetana, 2003
- Trechus mekbibi J.Schmidt & Faille, 2018
- Trechus melanocephalus Kolenati, 1845
- Trechus mengensis Belousov & Kabak, 2020
- Trechus menpa J.Schmidt, 2016
- Trechus merditanus Apfelbeck, 1906
- Trechus meregallii Casale, 1983
- Trechus merenicus Belousov & Kabak, 1994
- Trechus merkli Pawlowski, 1973
- Trechus meschniggi Jeannel, 1930
- Trechus messoulii Casale, 2011
- Trechus metrius Jeannel, 1935
- Trechus meurguesianus Deuve, 1980
- Trechus michaeli Pawlowski, 1978
- Trechus micrangulus Reitter, 1913
- Trechus midas Jeannel, 1927
- Trechus mieheorum J.Schmidt, 2009
- Trechus mila J.Schmidt, 2016
- Trechus minaicus Belousov & Kabak, 1994
- Trechus mingguangensis Deuve & Liang, 2016
- Trechus minioculatus Machado, 1987
- Trechus minitrechus J.Schmidt & Faille, 2018
- Trechus minshanicola Deuve, 2004
- Trechus minyops Wollaston, 1862
- Trechus mirzayani Morvan, 1974
- Trechus mitchellensis Barr, 1962
- Trechus mitjaevi Belousov & Kabak, 1996
- Trechus moctezuma Mateu, 1974
- Trechus modestus Putzeys, 1874
- Trechus mogul Belousov & Kabak, 2001
- Trechus mongolicus P.Moravec, 1992
- Trechus mongolorum Belousov & Kabak, 1994
- Trechus montanellus Gemminger & Harold, 1868
- Trechus montanheirorum Oromi & Borges, 1991 (Cave ground-beetle)
- Trechus montanus Motschulsky, 1844
- Trechus montisarerae Focarile, 1950
- Trechus montismaiellettae Ghidini, 1932
- Trechus montisrosae Jeannel, 1921
- Trechus montreuili Deuve, 2004
- Trechus morandinii Lebenbauer, 2002
- Trechus mordkovitschi Shilenkov, 1982
- Trechus morvanellus Deuve, 1996
- Trechus morvanianus Deuve & Queinnec, 1985
- Trechus mourzinellus Deuve, 1998
- Trechus mouzaiensis Jeannel, 1922
- Trechus muguensis J.Schmidt, 2009
- Trechus murzorum Belousov & Kabak, 1994
- Trechus muscorum P.Moravec & Wrase, 1998
- Trechus myanmarensis Deuve, 2004

== N ==
- Trechus nairicus Pavesi & Sciaky, 1992
- Trechus nakaguroi Ueno, 1960
- Trechus naldii Ghidini, 1932
- Trechus nami J.Schmidt, 2016
- Trechus namtsoensis J.Schmidt, 2009
- Trechus nannus Jeannel, 1935
- Trechus nantahalae Barr, 1979
- Trechus nanulus J.Schmidt & Faille, 2018
- Trechus naratensis Deuve, 1993
- Trechus narynensis Belousov & Kabak, 1992
- Trechus natmataungensis Donabauer, 2010
- Trechus navaricus (Vuillefroy, 1869)
- Trechus nebulosus Barr, 1962
- Trechus newar Deuve, 1988
- Trechus neyamensis J.Schmidt, 2016
- Trechus nezlobinskyi Hristovskyi, 2014
- Trechus nicoleae Moncoutier, 1986
- Trechus nigrans J.Schmidt, 2016
- Trechus nigrifemoralis J.Schmidt & Faille, 2018
- Trechus nigrinus Putzeys, 1847
- Trechus nigrocruciatus Wollaston, 1854
- Trechus nikolajevi Belousov & Kabak, 1992
- Trechus nivicola Chaudoir, 1846
- Trechus nomurai Ueno, 1998
- Trechus nonveilleri G.Müller, 1930
- Trechus noricus Meixner, 1911
- Trechus nothus Jeannel, 1960
- Trechus novaculosus Barr, 1962
- Trechus nugax Lompe, 1997
- Trechus numatai Ueno, 1967
- Trechus nyalamensis J.Schmidt, 2016

== O ==
- Trechus obliquebasalis Breit, 1914
- Trechus obtusiusculus Ganglbauer, 1889
- Trechus obtusus Erichson, 1837
- Trechus ochreatus Dejean, 1831
- Trechus odontopeos Fresneda; Valenzuela; Bourdeau & Faille, 2019
- Trechus ofensis Donabauer, 2013
- Trechus ogouzicus Deuve & Queinnec, 1992
- Trechus oligophthalmus Jeannel, 1935
- Trechus oligops Bedel, 1896
- Trechus olympicus Piochard de la Brûlerie, 1876
- Trechus ongudaicus Belousov & Kabak, 1996
- Trechus onicus Belousov & Kabak, 1994
- Trechus oodes Jeannel, 1935
- Trechus opgenoorthi J.Schmidt, 2016
- Trechus oppositus J.Schmidt & Faille, 2018
- Trechus ordinarior Deuve & Queinnec, 1993
- Trechus orduensis Donabauer, 2007
- Trechus oregonensis Hatch, 1951
- Trechus ormayi Ganglbauer, 1891
- Trechus oromiensis Magrini; Queinnec & Vigna Taglianti, 2012
- Trechus oromii Borges; Serrano & Amorim, 2004 (Cave ground-beetle)
- Trechus orousseti (Perrault, 1982)
- Trechus orphaeus Pawlowski, 1973
- Trechus orthapicalis Belousov & Kabak, 1998
- Trechus ortizi Español, 1970
- Trechus osellai F.Battoni & Vigna Taglianti, 1994
- Trechus osmanilis K. & J.Daniel, 1902
- Trechus ossae B.V.Gueorguiev, 2010
- Trechus ovatus Putzeys, 1845
- Trechus ovipennis Motschulsky, 1845
- Trechus ovtshinnikovi Belousov & Kabak, 1992

== P ==
- Trechus pachycerus Apfelbeck, 1918
- Trechus pallens Belousov & Kabak, 1994
- Trechus pallidulus Ganglbauer, 1891
- Trechus pamirensis Belousov & Kabak, 1996
- Trechus pamphylicus Jeanne, 1996
- Trechus paphlagonicus Maran, 1940
- Trechus parapandus Ortuño, 2015
- Trechus parvifrater J.Schmidt, 2016
- Trechus patrizii Jeannel, 1960
- Trechus pavlovskii Jeannel, 1962
- Trechus pecignai Toribio, 1992
- Trechus pennisii Magrini, 1984
- Trechus pereirai Borges; Serrano & Amorim, 2004 (Cave ground-beetle)
- Trechus perissus Andrewes, 1936
- Trechus perpusillus Mateu & Deuve, 1979
- Trechus perreaui Deuve & Queinnec, 1985
- Trechus pertyi Heer, 1837
- Trechus peynei Magrini & Sciaky, 2006
- Trechus phaeocerus Jeannel, 1935
- Trechus phagunensis J.Schmidt, 2016
- Trechus phami Deuve, 1981
- Trechus phanageriacus Belousov, 1990
- Trechus piazzolii Focarile, 1950
- Trechus picoensis Machado, 1988 (Cave ground-beetle)
- Trechus pieltaini Jeannel, 1920
- Trechus pilisensis Csiki, 1918
- Trechus pilonensis Toribio, 2014
- Trechus pilosicornis Deuve & Queinnec, 1993
- Trechus pilosipennis Jeannel, 1954
- Trechus pinkeri Ganglbauer, 1891
- Trechus pirinicus Pawlowski, 1972
- Trechus pisgahensis Barr, 1979
- Trechus pisuenensis Ortuño & Toribio, 2005
- Trechus placidus Jeannel, 1962
- Trechus planioculus Belousov & Kabak, 1993
- Trechus planipennis Rosenhauer, 1856
- Trechus planiusculus A.Costa, 1858
- Trechus platypterellus Belousov in Kryzhanovskij et al., 1995
- Trechus plicatulus L.Miller, 1868
- Trechus plottbalsamensis Donabauer, 2005
- Trechus pochoni Jeannel, 1939
- Trechus pohorjeensis Donabauer, 2006
- Trechus polonorum Pawlowski, 1979
- Trechus pomonae Fall, 1901
- Trechus pongensis Fresneda; Valenzuela; Bourdeau & Faille, 2019
- Trechus priapus K.Daniel, 1902
- Trechus processifer Belousov & Kabak, 1992
- Trechus promeces Jeannel, 1935
- Trechus przewalskyi Belousov & Kabak, 1993
- Trechus pseudoalmonius Deuve, 1993
- Trechus pseudoalyshensis Deuve & Queinnec, 1992
- Trechus pseudobarberi Donabauer, 2009
- Trechus pseudocholaensis Deuve, 1998
- Trechus pseudogansuensis Belousov & Kabak, 2000
- Trechus pseudokozlovi Deuve, 2011
- Trechus pseudolatus Lompe, 2011
- Trechus pseudomontanellus Rizun, 1994
- Trechus pseudonovaculosus Donabauer, 2005
- Trechus pseudopiceus K. & J.Daniel, 1898
- Trechus pseudoqiqiensis Deuve & Liang, 2016
- Trechus pseudosubtilis Donabauer, 2009
- Trechus puetzi P.Moravec & Wrase, 1998
- Trechus pulchellus Putzeys, 1845
- Trechus pulpani Reska, 1965
- Trechus pulvinipenis Belousov & Kabak, 1999
- Trechus pumilio Jeannel, 1923
- Trechus pumilus Jeannel, 1927
- Trechus pumoensis Deuve, 1998
- Trechus putchkovi Belousov & Kabak, 1996
- Trechus putzeysi Pandellé, 1867
- Trechus pyrenaeus Dejean, 1831

== Q ==
- Trechus qagcaensis Deuve, 1996
- Trechus qinghaicus Deuve & Queinnec, 1993
- Trechus qingmaiensis Deuve, 2011
- Trechus qiqiensis Deuve & Kavanaugh, 2016
- Trechus quadrimaculatus Motschulsky, 1850
- Trechus quadristriatus (Schrank, 1781)
- Trechus quarelicus Belousov, 1987
- Trechus qunlaishanicus Belousov & Kabak, 2020

== R ==
- Trechus raffrayanus Jeannel, 1954
- Trechus rambouseki Breit, 1909
- Trechus ramseyensis Donabauer, 2005
- Trechus rarus J.Schmidt, 2009
- Trechus ravasinianus Lorenz, 1998
- Trechus regularis Putzeys, 1870
- Trechus relictus Magrini; Queinnec & Vigna Taglianti, 2012
- Trechus religiosus J.Schmidt, 2009
- Trechus renei Belousov, 1990
- Trechus rhilensis Kaufmann, 1884
- Trechus rhodopeius Jeannel, 1921
- Trechus rhombus Belousov & Kabak, 2019
- Trechus riberai Fresneda; Valenzuela; Bourdeau & Faille, 2019
- Trechus rira J.Schmidt & Faille, 2018
- Trechus rivulis Dajoz, 2005
- Trechus roanicus Barr, 1962
- Trechus robustapicalis Belousov & Kabak, 1998
- Trechus rolwalingensis J.Schmidt, 2009
- Trechus ronchettii Reitter, 1911
- Trechus roparzhemoni Morvan, 1982
- Trechus rosenbergi Barr, 1962
- Trechus rotroui Antoine, 1934
- Trechus rotundatus Dejean, 1831
- Trechus rotundicollis (Basilewsky, 1974)
- Trechus rotundipennis (Duftschmid, 1812)
- Trechus rougemonti (Basilewsky, 1975)
- Trechus rougemontiellus Belousov, 2017
- Trechus rouxi Deuve, 1995
- Trechus rouxioides Deuve, 2005
- Trechus rubens (Fabricius, 1792)
- Trechus rudolphi Ganglbauer, 1891
- Trechus rufulus Dejean, 1831
- Trechus ruthi Jeannel, 1929

== S ==
- Trechus sachalinensis Lafer, 1989
- Trechus safranboluensis Donabauer, 2004
- Trechus sagax Jeannel, 1960
- Trechus saglensis Shilenkov, 1998
- Trechus sajanensis P.Moravec, 1993
- Trechus sajuncaicus Monguzzi, 2002
- Trechus salassus Jeannel, 1927
- Trechus saluki Belousov & Kabak, 2019
- Trechus sambylensis Belousov & Kabak, 1994
- Trechus sanettii J.Schmidt & Faille, 2018
- Trechus santaluciaensis Donabauer, 2014
- Trechus satanicus Barr, 1962
- Trechus saulcyanus Csiki, 1928
- Trechus sauricus Belousov & Kabak, 1992
- Trechus saxicola Putzeys, 1870
- Trechus sbordonii Vigna Taglianti, 1967
- Trechus scapulatus Belousov & Kabak, 1993
- Trechus schaufussi Putzeys, 1870
- Trechus schaumii Pandellé, 1867
- Trechus schillhammeri Donabauer, 2006
- Trechus schimperanus Jeannel, 1954
- Trechus schmalfussi Baehr, 1983
- Trechus schoenmanni Donabauer & Lebenbauer, 2005
- Trechus schuelkei P.Moravec & Wrase, 1998
- Trechus schuhi Donabauer, 2007
- Trechus schwarzi Jeannel, 1931
- Trechus schwienbacheri Donabauer & Lebenbauer, 2003
- Trechus schyberosiae Szallies & Schüle, 2011
- Trechus sciakyellus Deuve, 2001
- Trechus scitus Jeannel, 1960
- Trechus scotti Jeannel, 1936
- Trechus sculptipennis J.Schmidt, 2009
- Trechus selaensis Deuve, 2006
- Trechus semenovi Belousov & Kabak, 1992
- Trechus sendrai (Comas & Mateu, 2008)
- Trechus seserligensis Shilenkov, 1998
- Trechus sessitanus Monguzzi, 1985
- Trechus setitemporalis Deuve, 2005
- Trechus shaanxiensis P.Moravec & Wrase, 1998
- Trechus shaid Belousov & Kabak, 1998
- Trechus shakhensis Belousov, 1987
- Trechus shangensis Belousov & Kabak, 2020
- Trechus sharpi Jeannel, 1921
- Trechus shatrovskyi Belousov & Kabak, 1994
- Trechus shchurovi Belousov & Kabak, 1996
- Trechus shibalicus Deuve & Kavanaugh, 2016
- Trechus shilenkovi Belousov & Kabak, 1992
- Trechus shinganensis Shilenkov, 1998
- Trechus shivalensis Belousov & Kabak, 1998
- Trechus shiyueliang Deuve & Liang, 2016
- Trechus sichuanus Deuve, 1988
- Trechus signatus Wollaston, 1857
- Trechus sikhotealinus Ueno & Lafer, 1994
- Trechus silveiranus Lompe, 1997
- Trechus simienensis Jeannel, 1954
- Trechus simplicens Belousov & Kabak, 1993
- Trechus singularis J.Schmidt, 2009
- Trechus sinuatus Schaum, 1860
- Trechus sinus Belousov & Kabak, 2001
- Trechus sivellae Monguzzi, 2002
- Trechus sjostedti Alluaud, 1927
- Trechus skoupyi P.Moravec & Zieris, 1998
- Trechus smetanai Deuve, 2017
- Trechus snowbirdensis Donabauer, 2005
- Trechus sodalis Jeannel, 1960
- Trechus sogdianus Belousov & Kabak, 1998
- Trechus sokolovi Belousov, 1990
- Trechus solarii Jeannel, 1921
- Trechus solhoeyi J.Schmidt, 2009
- Trechus soma Mateu & Deuve, 1979
- Trechus songoricus Belousov & Kabak, 1992
- Trechus sotshiensis Belousov, 1987
- Trechus splendens Gemminger & Harold, 1868
- Trechus stanovskyi P.Moravec, 1993
- Trechus stefanschoedli Donabauer, 2005
- Trechus stenoderus Jeannel, 1935
- Trechus stictulus Belousov & Kabak, 1998
- Trechus stipraisi Belousov & Kabak, 1992
- Trechus straneoi Jeannel, 1931
- Trechus strasseri Ganglbauer, 1891
- Trechus stratiotes J.Schmidt, 2009
- Trechus striatulus Putzeys, 1847
- Trechus stricticollis Jeannel, 1927
- Trechus strigipennis Kiesenwetter, 1861
- Trechus strongylus Jeannel, 1935
- Trechus stupkai Barr, 1979
- Trechus suan Belousov & Kabak, 1994
- Trechus subacuminatus A.Fleischer, 1898
- Trechus subcordatus Chaudoir, 1846
- Trechus sublaevis Raffray, 1886
- Trechus subnotatus Dejean, 1831
- Trechus subtilis Barr, 1962
- Trechus subzoigeicola Deuve, 2009
- Trechus suensoni Jeannel, 1957
- Trechus suluk Belousov & Kabak, 1996
- Trechus sundukovi P.Moravec & Wrase, 1997
- Trechus suopoensis Belousov & Kabak, 2020
- Trechus surkiensis Deuve, 2004
- Trechus susamyrensis Belousov & Kabak, 1992
- Trechus suturalis Putzeys, 1870
- Trechus svanicus Belousov, 1989
- Trechus sylviae Lompe, 2000
- Trechus sylviahofmannae J.Schmidt, 2017
- Trechus sylvicola K. & J.Daniel, 1898
- Trechus szujeckii Pawlowski, 1972

== T ==
- Trechus taghizadehi Morvan, 1974
- Trechus talassicus Belousov & Kabak, 1992
- Trechus talequah Barr, 1962
- Trechus talgarensis Jeannel, 1927
- Trechus tamangi J.Schmidt, 1998
- Trechus tarbagataicus Belousov & Kabak, 1992
- Trechus tardokijanensis Lafer, 1989
- Trechus tatai Reboleira; Ortuño; Goncalves & Oromi, 2010
- Trechus tchibiloevi Anichtchenko, 2009
- Trechus teberdanus Jeannel, 1960
- Trechus teletskianus Belousov & Kabak, 1994
- Trechus tennesseensis Barr, 1962
- Trechus tenoensis Israelson & Palm, 1979
- Trechus tentek Belousov & Kabak, 1996
- Trechus tenuilimbatus K. & J.Daniel, 1898
- Trechus tenuiscapus Lindroth, 1961
- Trechus terceiranus Machado, 1988 (Cave ground-beetle)
- Trechus terrabravensis Borges; Serrano & Amorim, 2004 (Ground-beetle)
- Trechus terskeiensis Belousov & Kabak, 1992
- Trechus tesnensis Belousov & Kabak, 1999
- Trechus tetracoderus Gemminger & Harold, 1868
- Trechus teverganus Toribio, 2015
- Trechus tewoicus Deuve, 2009
- Trechus thai Deuve, 1995
- Trechus thaleri Franz, 1991
- Trechus thessalicus Meixner, 1928
- Trechus thessalonicus Jeannel, 1930
- Trechus thibetanus Jeannel, 1928
- Trechus thomasbarri Donabauer, 2005
- Trechus thorungiensis J.Schmidt, 1994
- Trechus thunderheadensis Donabauer, 2005
- Trechus tianchi Perreau, 1992
- Trechus tianshanivagus Deuve, 1993
- Trechus tilitshoensis J.Schmidt, 1994
- Trechus tingitanus Putzeys, 1870
- Trechus tishetshkini Belousov & Kabak, 1994
- Trechus tobiasi Donabauer, 2005
- Trechus toksanbaicus Belousov & Kabak, 1993
- Trechus tolucensis Bolivar y Pieltain, 1941
- Trechus tonitru Barr, 1962
- Trechus topaz Belousov & Kabak, 1998
- Trechus torgaut Belousov & Kabak, 2019
- Trechus toroticus Belousov & Kabak, 1996
- Trechus torrentialis Apfelbeck, 1908
- Trechus torressalai Ortuño & Arillo, 2005
- Trechus torretassoi Jeannel, 1937 (Ground-beetle)
- Trechus toxawayi Barr, 1979
- Trechus trachypachys Sciaky & Pavesi, 1995
- Trechus tragelaphus J.Schmidt & Faille, 2018
- Trechus transversicollis J.Schmidt & Faille, 2018
- Trechus triamicorum Ortuño & Jimenez-Valverde, 2011
- Trechus tristiculus K. & J.Daniel, 1898
- Trechus tsampa J.Schmidt, 2009
- Trechus tsanmensis Belousov & Kabak, 2019
- Trechus tseringi J.Schmidt, 2009
- Trechus tshildebaevi Belousov & Kabak, 1992
- Trechus tshitsherini Belousov, 1987
- Trechus tuckaleechee Barr, 1962
- Trechus tumidus Jeannel, 1921
- Trechus turgenicus Belousov & Kabak, 1994
- Trechus turkestanicus Belousov & Kabak, 1992
- Trechus turnai Deuve & Queinnec, 1993
- Trechus turnaianus Deuve, 1993
- Trechus turnaioides Deuve, 1998
- Trechus turukensis Belousov & Kabak, 1992
- Trechus tusquitee Barr, 1979
- Trechus tusquitensis Donabauer, 2005
- Trechus tuxeni Jeannel, 1957
- Trechus tychus Jeannel, 1960
- Trechus tyrrhenicus Jeannel, 1927
- Trechus tyshkanensis Deuve & Queinnec, 1992

== U ==
- Trechus udiensis Ortuño, 2017
- Trechus uenyeensis Donabauer, 2006
- Trechus ulrichi Pawlowski, 1976
- Trechus umbricola Wollaston, 1854
- Trechus uncifer Barr, 1962
- Trechus unicoi Barr, 1979
- Trechus urartaeus Pavesi & Sciaky, 1994
- Trechus usgentensis Belousov & Kabak, 1998
- Trechus utschderensis Reitter, 1890
- Trechus utsi J.Schmidt, 2016
- Trechus uygur Deuve, 1993
- Trechus uygurorum Belousov & Kabak, 1994
- Trechus uyttenboogaarti Jeannel, 1936

== V ==
- Trechus valbonensis Jeannel, 1927
- Trechus valentinei Barr, 1979
- Trechus valenzuelai Fresneda; Bourdeau & Faille, 2015
- Trechus validicollis Sciaky & Pavesi, 1995
- Trechus validipes K.Daniel, 1902
- Trechus valikhanovi Belousov & Kabak, 1993
- Trechus vallestris K. & J.Daniel, 1898
- Trechus vandykei (Jeannel, 1927)
- Trechus varendorffi Sainte-Claire Deville, 1903
- Trechus verus Barr, 1962
- Trechus vietnamicus Ueno, 1995
- Trechus vignai Casale, 1979
- Trechus viti Pawlowski, 1977

== W ==
- Trechus wagneri Ganglbauer, 1906
- Trechus walteri Pawlowski, 1978
- Trechus wayahbaldensis Donabauer, 2005
- Trechus weiratheri Jeannel, 1929
- Trechus weiserti Donabauer, 2007
- Trechus weixiensis Belousov & Kabak, 2000
- Trechus wiersbowskyi J.Schmidt & Faille, 2018
- Trechus winkleri Jeannel, 1927
- Trechus witkowskii Pawlowski, 1978
- Trechus wittmeri Ueno, 1977
- Trechus wrzecionkoellus Deuve, 2011
- Trechus wrzecionkoi Deuve, 1996
- Trechus wrzecionkoianus Deuve, 2005
- Trechus wutaicola (Deuve, 1988)

== X Y Z ==
- Trechus xiei Deuve, 1992
- Trechus xinjiangensis Deuve, 1992
- Trechus xiwuensis Deuve, 1996
- Trechus yak J.Schmidt, 2009
- Trechus yanoi Jeannel, 1937
- Trechus yaralensis Belousov & Kabak, 2000
- Trechus yasudai Ueno, 1973
- Trechus yengensis Morvan, 1982
- Trechus yeti J.Schmidt, 2009
- Trechus yvesbousqueti Donabauer, 2010
- Trechus zaerensis Antoine, 1928
- Trechus zamotajlovi Belousov, 1990
- Trechus zangherii Jeannel, 1927
- Trechus zarandicus P.Moravec, 1986
- Trechus zaslavskii Jeannel, 1962
- Trechus zetteli Donabauer, 2007
- Trechus zhabyk Belousov & Kabak, 1994
- Trechus zhangi Deuve, 1989
- Trechus zhaosuensis Deuve, 2004
- Trechus zhdankoi Belousov & Kabak, 1992
- Trechus zhugquicus Deuve, 2009
- Trechus ziganensis Jeanne, 1976
- Trechus zinovievi Belousov & Kabak, 1996
- Trechus zintshenkoi Belousov & Kabak, 1999
- Trechus zoigeicola Belousov & Kabak, 2000
- Trechus zoigensis Deuve, 1989
- Trechus zolotikhini Belousov, 1990
- Trechus zonguldakensis Donabauer, 2004
- Trechus zorgatii Quéinnec & Ollivier, 2013
- Trechus zvarici Belousov & Kabak, 2000

== Extinct ==
- † Trechus balticus J.Schmidt & Faille, 2015
- † Trechus capito Forster, 1891
- † Trechus eoanophthalmus J.Schmidt; Hoffmann & Michalik, 2016
- † Trechus exhibitorius J.Schmidt; Belousov & Michalik, 2016
- † Trechus fractus Wickham, 1912
