= Trechus arizonae =

Scientific classification
- Kingdom: Animalia
- Phylum: Arthropoda
- Class: Insecta
- Order: Coleoptera
- Suborder: Adephaga
- Family: Carabidae
- Genus: Trechus
- Species: T. arizonae

Binomial name
- Trechus arizonae Casey, 1918

Species of beetle

Trechus arizonae is a species of ground beetle in the subfamily Trechinae. It was described by Casey in 1918.
