= Trechus thunderheadensis =

Scientific classification
- Domain: Eukaryota
- Kingdom: Animalia
- Phylum: Arthropoda
- Class: Insecta
- Order: Coleoptera
- Suborder: Adephaga
- Family: Carabidae
- Genus: Trechus
- Species: T. thunderheadensis

Binomial name
- Trechus thunderheadensis Donabauer, 2005

Species of beetle

Trechus thunderheadensis is a species of ground beetle in the subfamily Trechinae. It was described by Donabauer in 2005.
