= Trechus ambarasensis =

Scientific classification
- Domain: Eukaryota
- Kingdom: Animalia
- Phylum: Arthropoda
- Class: Insecta
- Order: Coleoptera
- Suborder: Adephaga
- Family: Carabidae
- Subfamily: Trechinae
- Genus: Trechus
- Species: T. ambarasensis

Binomial name
- Trechus ambarasensis Jeannel, 1954

Synonyms
- Trechus ambarensis

Species of beetle

Trechus ambarasensis is a species in the beetle family Carabidae. It is found in Ethiopia.
