= Trechus akibensis =

Scientific classification
- Domain: Eukaryota
- Kingdom: Animalia
- Phylum: Arthropoda
- Class: Insecta
- Order: Coleoptera
- Suborder: Adephaga
- Family: Carabidae
- Genus: Trechus
- Species: T. akibensis

Binomial name
- Trechus akibensis Belousov, 1990

Species of beetle

Trechus akibensis is a species of ground beetle in the subfamily Trechinae. It was described by Belousov in 1990.
