= Trechus egregius =

Scientific classification
- Domain: Eukaryota
- Kingdom: Animalia
- Phylum: Arthropoda
- Class: Insecta
- Order: Coleoptera
- Suborder: Adephaga
- Family: Carabidae
- Subfamily: Trechinae
- Genus: Trechus
- Species: T. egregius

Binomial name
- Trechus egregius Jeannel, 1927

Species of beetle

Trechus egregius is a species in the beetle family Carabidae. It is found in former Yugoslavia and Albania.
