= Trechus avgolensis =

Scientific classification
- Domain: Eukaryota
- Kingdom: Animalia
- Phylum: Arthropoda
- Class: Insecta
- Order: Coleoptera
- Suborder: Adephaga
- Family: Carabidae
- Subfamily: Trechinae
- Genus: Trechus
- Species: T. avgolensis

Binomial name
- Trechus avgolensis Belousov & Kabak, 1998

Species of beetle

Trechus avgolensis is a species of ground beetle in the subfamily Trechinae. It is found in Kyrgyzstan.
