= Trechus barratxinai =

Scientific classification
- Domain: Eukaryota
- Kingdom: Animalia
- Phylum: Arthropoda
- Class: Insecta
- Order: Coleoptera
- Suborder: Adephaga
- Family: Carabidae
- Genus: Trechus
- Species: T. barratxinai

Binomial name
- Trechus barratxinai Espanol, 1971

Species of ground beetle

Trechus barratxinai is a species of ground beetle in the subfamily Trechinae. It was described by Espanol in 1971.
