= Trechus achillecasalei =

Scientific classification
- Domain: Eukaryota
- Kingdom: Animalia
- Phylum: Arthropoda
- Class: Insecta
- Order: Coleoptera
- Suborder: Adephaga
- Family: Carabidae
- Genus: Trechus
- Species: T. achillecasalei

Binomial name
- Trechus achillecasalei Deuve, 1998

Species of beetle

Trechus achillecasalei is a species of ground beetle in the subfamily Trechinae. It was described by Deuve in 1998.
