= Trechus rarus =

Scientific classification
- Domain: Eukaryota
- Kingdom: Animalia
- Phylum: Arthropoda
- Class: Insecta
- Order: Coleoptera
- Suborder: Adephaga
- Family: Carabidae
- Subfamily: Trechinae
- Genus: Trechus
- Species: T. rarus

Binomial name
- Trechus rarus Schmidt, 2009

Species of beetle

Trechus rarus is a species of ground beetle in the subfamily Trechinae, found in China. It was described by Schmidt in 2009.
