= Trechus ambrolauricus =

Scientific classification
- Domain: Eukaryota
- Kingdom: Animalia
- Phylum: Arthropoda
- Class: Insecta
- Order: Coleoptera
- Suborder: Adephaga
- Family: Carabidae
- Genus: Trechus
- Species: T. ambrolauricus

Binomial name
- Trechus ambrolauricus Belousov, 1989

Species of beetle

Trechus ambrolauricus is a species of ground beetle in the subfamily Trechinae. It was described by Belousov in 1989.
