= Trechus zarandicus =

Scientific classification
- Domain: Eukaryota
- Kingdom: Animalia
- Phylum: Arthropoda
- Class: Insecta
- Order: Coleoptera
- Suborder: Adephaga
- Family: Carabidae
- Genus: Trechus
- Species: T. zarandicus

Binomial name
- Trechus zarandicus P. Moravec, 1986

Species of beetle

Trechus zarandicus is a species of ground beetle in the subfamily Trechinae. It was described by P. Moravec in 1986.
