= Trechus latebricola =

Scientific classification
- Domain: Eukaryota
- Kingdom: Animalia
- Phylum: Arthropoda
- Class: Insecta
- Order: Coleoptera
- Suborder: Adephaga
- Family: Carabidae
- Genus: Trechus
- Species: T. latebricola

Binomial name
- Trechus latebricola Kiesenwetter, 1850

Species of beetle

Trechus latebricola is a species of ground beetle in the subfamily Trechinae. It was described by Kiesenwetter in 1850.
