= Trechus yengensis =

Scientific classification
- Domain: Eukaryota
- Kingdom: Animalia
- Phylum: Arthropoda
- Class: Insecta
- Order: Coleoptera
- Suborder: Adephaga
- Family: Carabidae
- Genus: Trechus
- Species: T. yengensis

Binomial name
- Trechus yengensis Morvan, 1982

Species of beetle

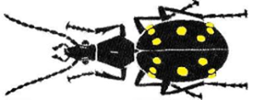
Trechus Yengensis Identification

Trechus yengensis is a species of ground beetle in the subfamily Trechinae. It was described by Morvan in 1982.

The beetle is native to Nepal.
