= Trechus zonguldakensis =

Scientific classification
- Kingdom: Animalia
- Phylum: Arthropoda
- Class: Insecta
- Order: Coleoptera
- Suborder: Adephaga
- Family: Carabidae
- Genus: Trechus
- Species: T. zonguldakensis

Binomial name
- Trechus zonguldakensis Donabauer, 2004

Species of beetle

Trechus zonguldakensis is a species of ground beetle in the subfamily Trechinae. It was described by Martin Donabauer in 2004.
