= Trechus nannus =

Scientific classification
- Domain: Eukaryota
- Kingdom: Animalia
- Phylum: Arthropoda
- Class: Insecta
- Order: Coleoptera
- Suborder: Adephaga
- Family: Carabidae
- Subfamily: Trechinae
- Genus: Trechus
- Species: T. nannus

Binomial name
- Trechus nannus Jeannel, 1935

Species of beetle

Trechus nannus is a species of ground beetle found in eastern Africa.
