= Trechus hydropicus =

Scientific classification
- Domain: Eukaryota
- Kingdom: Animalia
- Phylum: Arthropoda
- Class: Insecta
- Order: Coleoptera
- Suborder: Adephaga
- Family: Carabidae
- Genus: Trechus
- Species: T. hydropicus

Binomial name
- Trechus hydropicus G. Horn, 1883

Species of beetle

Trechus hydropicus is a species of ground beetle in the family Carabidae. It is found in North America.

== Subspecies ==
These four subspecies belong to the species Trechus hydropicus:

- Trechus hydropicus avus Barr, 1962
- Trechus hydropicus beutenmuelleri Jeannel, 1931
- Trechus hydropicus canus Barr, 1962
- Trechus hydropicus hydropicus G. Horn, 1883
