= Trechus merenicus =

Scientific classification
- Kingdom: Animalia
- Phylum: Arthropoda
- Clade: Pancrustacea
- Class: Insecta
- Order: Coleoptera
- Suborder: Adephaga
- Family: Carabidae
- Genus: Trechus
- Species: T. merenicus

Binomial name
- Trechus merenicus Belousov & Kabak, 1994

Species of beetle

Trechus merenicus is a species of ground beetle in the subfamily Trechinae. It was described by Belousov & Kabak in 1994.

== Description ==
The species is described as small beetle native to Central Asia.
