= Trechus dzermukensis =

Scientific classification
- Domain: Eukaryota
- Kingdom: Animalia
- Phylum: Arthropoda
- Class: Insecta
- Order: Coleoptera
- Suborder: Adephaga
- Family: Carabidae
- Genus: Trechus
- Species: T. dzermukensis

Binomial name
- Trechus dzermukensis Iablokoff-Khnzorian, 1963

Species of beetle

Trechus dzermukensis is a species of ground beetle in the subfamily Trechinae. It was described by Iablokoff-Khnzorian in 1963.
