= Trechus apoduvalipenis =

Scientific classification
- Domain: Eukaryota
- Kingdom: Animalia
- Phylum: Arthropoda
- Class: Insecta
- Order: Coleoptera
- Suborder: Adephaga
- Family: Carabidae
- Genus: Trechus
- Species: T. apoduvalipenis

Binomial name
- Trechus apoduvalipenis Salgado Costas & Ortuno, 1998

Species of beetle

Trechus apoduvalipenis is a species of ground beetle in the subfamily Trechinae. It was first described by Salgado Costas & Ortuno in 1998.
