= Trechus lailensis =

Scientific classification
- Domain: Eukaryota
- Kingdom: Animalia
- Phylum: Arthropoda
- Class: Insecta
- Order: Coleoptera
- Suborder: Adephaga
- Family: Carabidae
- Subfamily: Trechinae
- Genus: Trechus
- Species: T. lailensis

Binomial name
- Trechus lailensis Belousov, 1989

Species of beetle

Trechus lailensis is a species of ground beetle in the subfamily Trechinae, found in the Republic of Georgia. It is one of more than 1000 species in the genus Trechus.
