= Trechus bowlingi =

Scientific classification
- Domain: Eukaryota
- Kingdom: Animalia
- Phylum: Arthropoda
- Class: Insecta
- Order: Coleoptera
- Suborder: Adephaga
- Family: Carabidae
- Genus: Trechus
- Species: T. bowlingi

Binomial name
- Trechus bowlingi Barr, 1962

Species of beetle

Trechus bowlingi is a species of ground beetle in the subfamily Trechinae. It was described by Barr in 1962.
