= Trechus wrzecionkoianus =

Scientific classification
- Domain: Eukaryota
- Kingdom: Animalia
- Phylum: Arthropoda
- Class: Insecta
- Order: Coleoptera
- Suborder: Adephaga
- Family: Carabidae
- Subfamily: Trechinae
- Genus: Trechus
- Species: T. wrzecionkoianus

Binomial name
- Trechus wrzecionkoianus Deuve, 2005

Synonyms
- Trechus chaklaensis J.Schmidt, 2009; Trechus wrcecionkoianus

Species of beetle

Trechus wrzecionkoianus is a species in the beetle family Carabidae. It is found in China.
