= Trechus arthuri =

Scientific classification
- Domain: Eukaryota
- Kingdom: Animalia
- Phylum: Arthropoda
- Class: Insecta
- Order: Coleoptera
- Suborder: Adephaga
- Family: Carabidae
- Genus: Trechus
- Species: T. arthuri

Binomial name
- Trechus arthuri P. Moravec & Lompe, In Lobl & Smetana, 2003

Species of beetle

Trechus arthuri is a species of ground beetle in the subfamily Trechinae. It was described by P. Moravec & Lompe, In Lobl & Smetana in 2003.
