= Trechus amharicus =

Scientific classification
- Domain: Eukaryota
- Kingdom: Animalia
- Phylum: Arthropoda
- Class: Insecta
- Order: Coleoptera
- Suborder: Adephaga
- Superfamily: Caraboidea
- Family: Carabidae
- Subfamily: Trechinae
- Genus: Trechus
- Species: T. amharicus

Binomial name
- Trechus amharicus Ortuño & Novoa, 2011

Species of beetle

Trechus amharicus is a species in the beetle family Carabidae. It is found in Ethiopia.
