= Trechus hodeberti =

Scientific classification
- Domain: Eukaryota
- Kingdom: Animalia
- Phylum: Arthropoda
- Class: Insecta
- Order: Coleoptera
- Suborder: Adephaga
- Family: Carabidae
- Subfamily: Trechinae
- Genus: Trechus
- Species: T. hodeberti

Binomial name
- Trechus hodeberti Deuve, 1998

Species of beetle

Trechus hodeberti is a species in the beetle family Carabidae. It is found in China.
