= Trechus safranboluensis =

Scientific classification
- Domain: Eukaryota
- Kingdom: Animalia
- Phylum: Arthropoda
- Class: Insecta
- Order: Coleoptera
- Suborder: Adephaga
- Family: Carabidae
- Genus: Trechus
- Species: T. safranboluensis

Binomial name
- Trechus safranboluensis Donabauer, 2004

Species of beetle

Trechus safranboluensis is a species of ground beetle in the subfamily Trechinae. It was described by Donabauer in 2004.
