= Trechus cumberlandus =

Scientific classification
- Domain: Eukaryota
- Kingdom: Animalia
- Phylum: Arthropoda
- Class: Insecta
- Order: Coleoptera
- Suborder: Adephaga
- Family: Carabidae
- Genus: Trechus
- Species: T. cumberlandus

Binomial name
- Trechus cumberlandus Barr, 1962

Species of beetle

Trechus cumberlandus is a species of ground beetle in the subfamily Trechinae. It was described by Thomas Barr in 1962.

Trechus cumberlandus has a length ranging from 3.4 to 3.8 mm (0.13 to 0.15 in) and has a brownish black colouration. Their elytra have only faint ridges.

Their common habitat is caves with high humidity.
