= Trechus bosnicus =

Scientific classification
- Domain: Eukaryota
- Kingdom: Animalia
- Phylum: Arthropoda
- Class: Insecta
- Order: Coleoptera
- Suborder: Adephaga
- Superfamily: Caraboidea
- Family: Carabidae
- Subfamily: Trechinae
- Genus: Trechus
- Species: T. bosnicus

Binomial name
- Trechus bosnicus Ganglbauer, 1891

Species of beetle

Trechus bosnicus is a species in the beetle family Carabidae. It is found in Bosnia-Herzegovina, (former) Yugoslavia, and Montenegro.

== Subspecies ==
These two subspecies belong to the species Trechus bosnicus:

- Trechus bosnicus bosnicus Ganglbauer, 1891 (Bosnia-Herzegovina, former Yugoslavia, and Montenegro)
- Trechus bosnicus frigidus Apfelbeck, 1904 (Bosnia-Herzegovina)
