= Caelostomus basilewskyi =

Scientific classification
- Kingdom: Animalia
- Phylum: Arthropoda
- Class: Insecta
- Order: Coleoptera
- Suborder: Adephaga
- Family: Carabidae
- Genus: Caelostomus
- Species: C. basilewskyi

Binomial name
- Caelostomus basilewskyi Straneo, 1948

Species of beetle

Caelostomus basilewskyi is a species of ground beetle in the subfamily Pterostichinae. It was first described by Stefano Ludovico Straneo in 1948.

This species is found in Cameroon.
