= Abacetus subauratus =

Scientific classification
- Kingdom: Animalia
- Phylum: Arthropoda
- Clade: Pancrustacea
- Class: Insecta
- Order: Coleoptera
- Suborder: Adephaga
- Family: Carabidae
- Genus: Abacetus
- Species: A. subauratus

Binomial name
- Abacetus subauratus Straneo, 1949

Species of beetle

Abacetus subauratus is a species of ground beetle in the subfamily Pterostichinae. It occurs in the Democratic Republic of the Congo and Tanzania.
