= Caelostomus kivuanus =

Scientific classification
- Kingdom: Animalia
- Phylum: Arthropoda
- Class: Insecta
- Order: Coleoptera
- Suborder: Adephaga
- Family: Carabidae
- Genus: Caelostomus
- Species: C. kivuanus

Binomial name
- Caelostomus kivuanus Straneo, 1955

Species of beetle

Caelostomus kivuanus is a species of ground beetle in the subfamily Pterostichinae. It was first described by Straneo in 1955.

This species is found in DR Congo.
