= Caelostomus buruanus =

Scientific classification
- Kingdom: Animalia
- Phylum: Arthropoda
- Class: Insecta
- Order: Coleoptera
- Suborder: Adephaga
- Family: Carabidae
- Genus: Caelostomus
- Species: C. buruanus

Binomial name
- Caelostomus buruanus Straneo, 1939

Species of beetle

Caelostomus buruanus is a species of ground beetle in the subfamily Pterostichinae. It was first described by Straneo in 1939.

This species is found in Indonesia.
