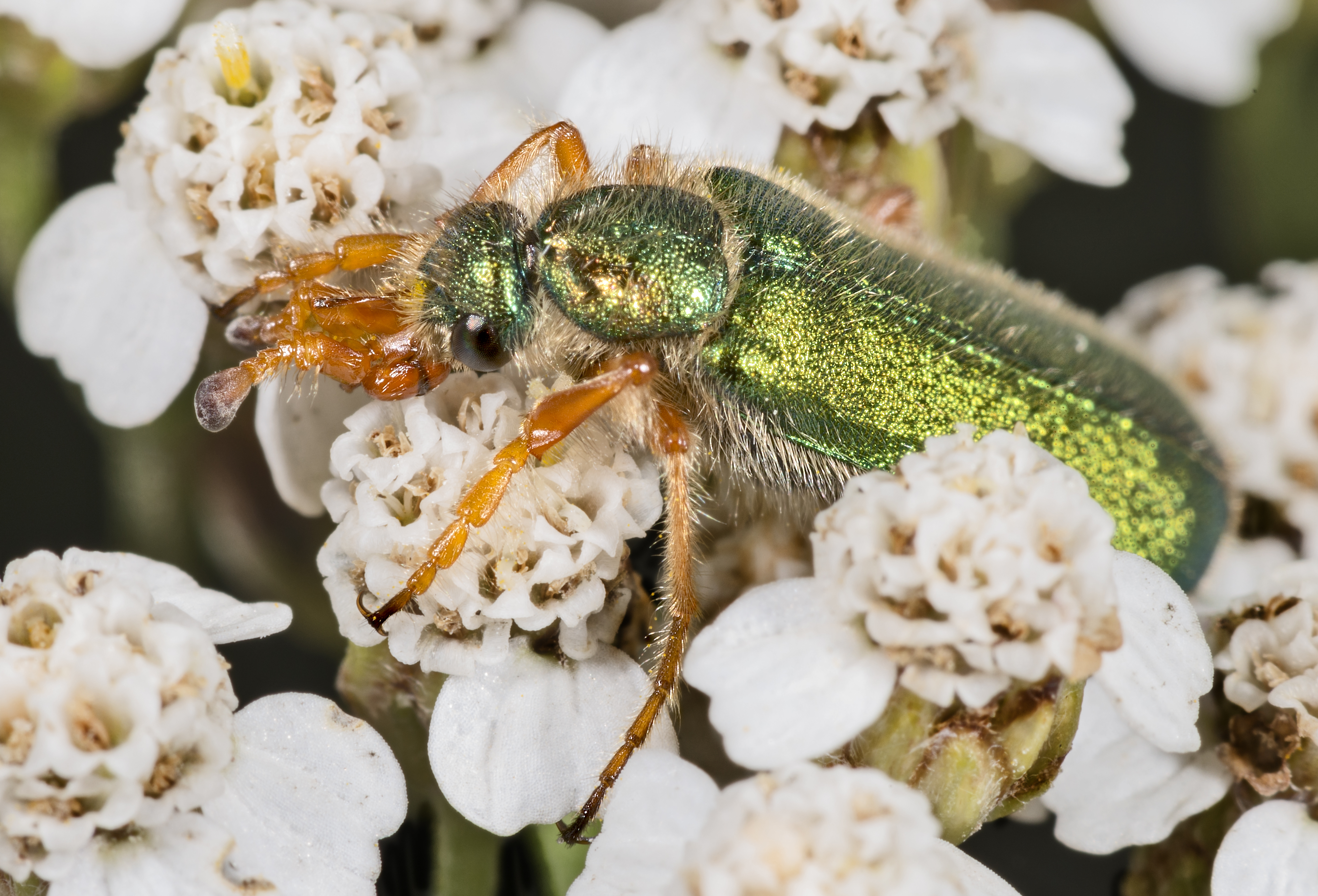
- Cerocoma schaefferi

Scientific classification
- Kingdom: Animalia
- Phylum: Arthropoda
- Clade: Pancrustacea
- Class: Insecta
- Order: Coleoptera
- Suborder: Polyphaga
- Infraorder: Cucujiformia
- Family: Meloidae
- Tribe: Cerocomini
- Genus: Cerocoma; Geoffroy, 1762

= Cerocoma =

Genus of beetles

Cerocoma is a Palearctic genus of blister beetle, whose biology is poorly known. As in other members of the family, these insects are hypermetamorphic. Larval hosts of few species were described. Imagines show distinct sexual dimorphism in the feeding apparatus and the antennae. All species in this genus have aposematic colouration.

The antennae are 9-segmented, and the galea is modified into a sucking tube; imagines feed on pollen and nectar of Asteraceae and Apiaceae plants. The wings are well-developed, and the legs are long and slender.

Larvae of C. schreberi were found feeding on paralysed mantids collected by Tachytes wasps.

The genus is mostly Mediterranean in distribution, and encompasses about 27 species. Fauna Europaea lists 13 species The taxonomic division into two subgenera, Cerocoma and Metacerocoma (Kaszab, 1951) was considered unfounded by some authors. Based on morphological and molecular analysis, Turco and Bologna subdivided the genus into five subgenera: Cerocoma, Cerocomina, Mesocerocoma, Metacerocoma and Meloides.

== List of species ==
Subgenus Metacerocoma

- Cerocoma ephesica Reitter, 1885
- Cerocoma prevezaensis Dvorak, 1993
- Cerocoma schreberi (Fabricius, 1781)

Subgenus Cerocoma

- Cerocoma adamovichiana (Piller et Mitterpacher, 1783)
- Cerocoma albopilosa Dvořák, 1993
- Cerocoma barthelemii Baudi, 1878
- Cerocoma dahli Kraatz, 1863
- Cerocoma festiva Faldermann, 1837
- Cerocoma gloriosa Mulsant, 1857
- Cerocoma graeca Maran, 1944
- Cerocoma kunzei E. Frivaldsky, 1835
- Cerocoma latreillei Baudi, 1878
- Cerocoma macedonica Maran, 1944
- Cerocoma muehlfeldi Gyllenhal, 1817
- Cerocoma schaefferi (Linnaeus, 1758)
- Cerocoma scovitzi Faldermann, 1837
- Cerocoma syriaca Abeille de Perrin, 1880
- Cerocoma turcica Pardo Alcaide, 1977
- Cerocoma vahli Fabricius, 1787
