= Caelostomus obscuripes =

Scientific classification
- Kingdom: Animalia
- Phylum: Arthropoda
- Clade: Pancrustacea
- Class: Insecta
- Order: Coleoptera
- Suborder: Adephaga
- Family: Carabidae
- Subfamily: Pterostichinae
- Genus: Caelostomus
- Species: C. obscuripes

Binomial name
- Caelostomus obscuripes Straneo, 1938

Species of beetle

Caelostomus obscuripes is a species in the ground beetle family Carabidae, found in India.

This species was first described by Straneo in 1938.
