= Aphaenops loubensi =

Scientific classification
- Kingdom: Animalia
- Phylum: Arthropoda
- Class: Insecta
- Order: Coleoptera
- Suborder: Adephaga
- Family: Carabidae
- Genus: Aphaenops
- Species: A. loubensi

Binomial name
- Aphaenops loubensi Jeannel, 1953

Species of beetle

Aphaenops loubensi is a species of beetle in the subfamily Trechinae. It was described by Jeannel in 1953.
