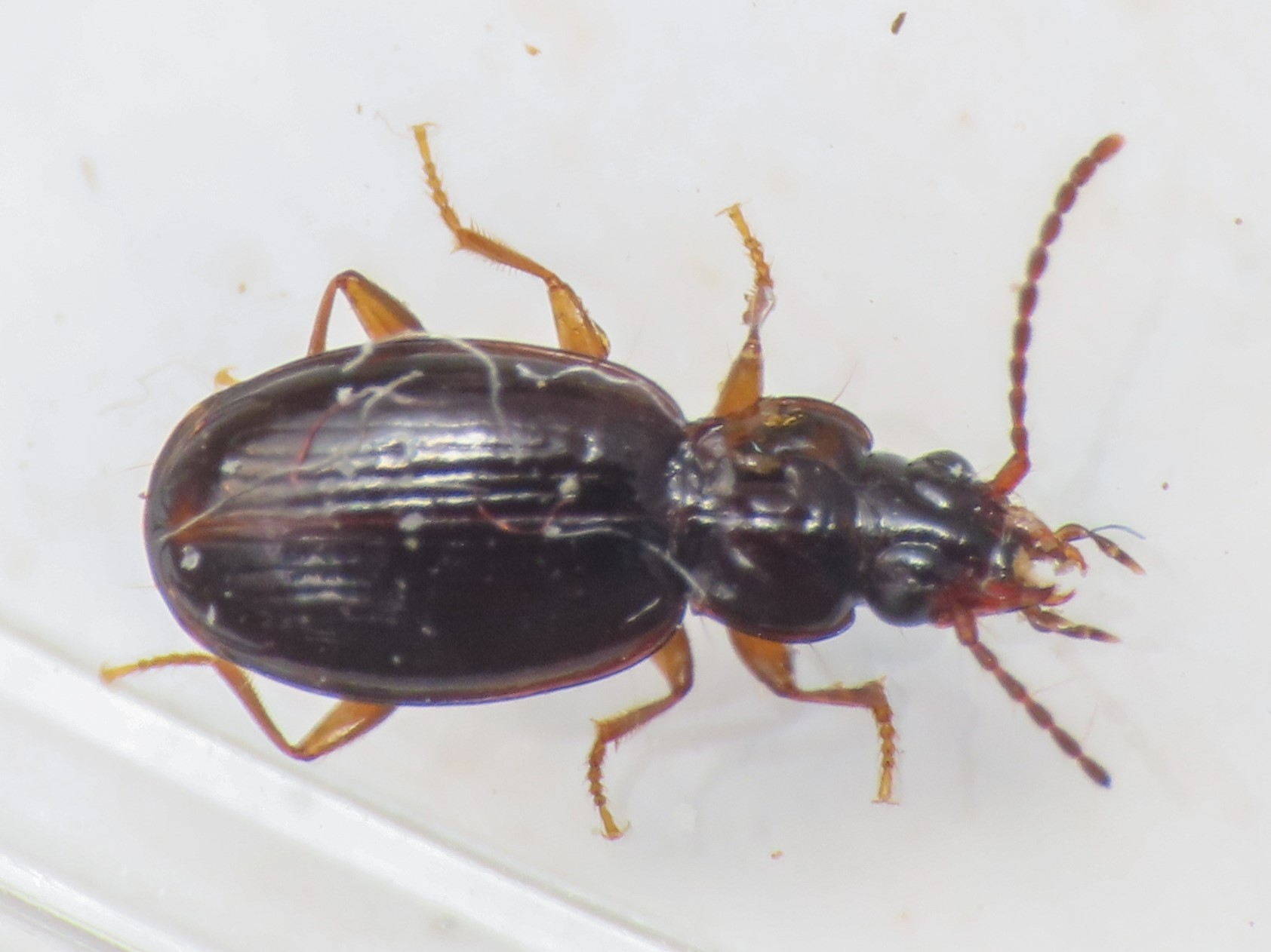

Scientific classification
- Kingdom: Animalia
- Phylum: Arthropoda
- Class: Insecta
- Order: Coleoptera
- Suborder: Adephaga
- Family: Carabidae
- Genus: Trechus
- Species: T. hummleri

Binomial name
- Trechus hummleri Jeannel, 1927

= Trechus hummleri =

Species of beetle

Trechus hummleri is a species of ground beetle in the subfamily Trechinae. It was first described by René Jeannel in 1927.
