= Abacetus catersi =

Scientific classification
- Domain: Eukaryota
- Kingdom: Animalia
- Phylum: Arthropoda
- Class: Insecta
- Order: Coleoptera
- Suborder: Adephaga
- Family: Carabidae
- Genus: Abacetus
- Species: A. catersi

Binomial name
- Abacetus catersi Straneo, 1958

Species of beetle

Abacetus catersi is a species of ground beetle in the subfamily Pterostichinae, described by Stefano Ludovico Straneo in 1958.
