= Caelostomus cribratus =

Scientific classification
- Domain: Eukaryota
- Kingdom: Animalia
- Phylum: Arthropoda
- Class: Insecta
- Order: Coleoptera
- Suborder: Adephaga
- Family: Carabidae
- Genus: Caelostomus
- Species: C. cribratus

Binomial name
- Caelostomus cribratus Jeannel, 1948

Species of beetle

Caelostomus cribratus is a species of ground beetle in the subfamily Pterostichinae. It was described by René Jeannel in 1948.

This species is found in Madagascar.
