= Eunidia jeanneli =

Scientific classification
- Kingdom: Animalia
- Phylum: Arthropoda
- Clade: Pancrustacea
- Class: Insecta
- Order: Coleoptera
- Suborder: Polyphaga
- Infraorder: Cucujiformia
- Family: Cerambycidae
- Genus: Eunidia
- Species: E. jeanneli

Binomial name
- Eunidia jeanneli Breuning, 1939

Synonyms
- Eunidia bifuscofasciata Breuning, 1955; Eunidia bimaculipennis Breuning, 1954; Eunidia densepunctata Breuning, 1942; Eunidia fuscofasciata Breuning, 1986; Eunidia vagevittipennis Breuning, 1981; Eunidia varidoxa Teocchi, 1985

Species of beetle

Eunidia jeanneli is a species of beetle in the family Cerambycidae. It was described by Stephan von Breuning in 1939. It is known from Tanzania, Somalia, Kenya, Zimbabwe, and South Africa.

It's 4.5–7 mm long and 1–1.7 mm wide, and its type locality is Neu-Moschi, in the Kilimanjaro Region of Tanzania. It was named in honor of the French entomologist René Jeannel.
