= Abacetus kivuanus =

Scientific classification
- Kingdom: Animalia
- Phylum: Arthropoda
- Clade: Pancrustacea
- Class: Insecta
- Order: Coleoptera
- Suborder: Adephaga
- Family: Carabidae
- Genus: Abacetus
- Species: A. kivuanus

Binomial name
- Abacetus kivuanus Straneo, 1944

Species of beetle

Abacetus kivuanus is a species of ground beetle in the subfamily Pterostichinae. It is known from the Democratic Republic of the Congo.
