= Abacetus aeneovirescens =

Scientific classification
- Kingdom: Animalia
- Phylum: Arthropoda
- Clade: Pancrustacea
- Class: Insecta
- Order: Coleoptera
- Suborder: Adephaga
- Family: Carabidae
- Genus: Abacetus
- Species: A. aeneovirescens

Binomial name
- Abacetus aeneovirescens Straneo, 1939

Species of beetle

Abacetus aeneovirescens is a species of ground beetle in the subfamily Pterostichinae. It was described by Stefano Ludovico Straneo in 1939. The species is found in West Africa (Mauritania, Senegal, Nigeria), Central Africa (the Democratic Republic of the Congo), East Africa (Tanzania, Uganda, Ethiopia, Somalia ), and the Arabian Peninsula (Yemen).

Two subspecies can be distinguished:

- Abacetus aeneovirescens aeneovirescens Straneo, 1939
- Abacetus aeneovirescens microsculptus Straneo, 1941
