= Abacetus monardianus =

Scientific classification
- Domain: Eukaryota
- Kingdom: Animalia
- Phylum: Arthropoda
- Class: Insecta
- Order: Coleoptera
- Suborder: Adephaga
- Family: Carabidae
- Genus: Abacetus
- Species: A. monardianus

Binomial name
- Abacetus monardianus Straneo, 1952

Species of beetle

Abacetus monardianus is a species of ground beetle in the subfamily Pterostichinae. It was described by Stefano Ludovico Straneo in 1952.
