= Caelostomus burgeoni =

Scientific classification
- Kingdom: Animalia
- Phylum: Arthropoda
- Class: Insecta
- Order: Coleoptera
- Suborder: Adephaga
- Family: Carabidae
- Genus: Caelostomus
- Species: C. burgeoni

Binomial name
- Caelostomus burgeoni Straneo, 1941

Species of beetle

Caelostomus burgeoni is a species of ground beetle in the subfamily Pterostichinae. It was first described by Straneo in 1941.

This species is found in Africa.
