= Caelostomus castaneus =

Scientific classification
- Kingdom: Animalia
- Phylum: Arthropoda
- Class: Insecta
- Order: Coleoptera
- Suborder: Adephaga
- Family: Carabidae
- Genus: Caelostomus
- Species: C. castaneus

Binomial name
- Caelostomus castaneus Straneo, 1941

Species of beetle

Caelostomus castaneus is a species of ground beetle in the subfamily Pterostichinae. It was first described by Straneo in 1941.

This species is found in DR Congo, Uganda, Tanzania, and Malawi.
