= Caelostomus distinctus =

Scientific classification
- Domain: Eukaryota
- Kingdom: Animalia
- Phylum: Arthropoda
- Class: Insecta
- Order: Coleoptera
- Suborder: Adephaga
- Family: Carabidae
- Genus: Caelostomus
- Species: C. distinctus

Binomial name
- Caelostomus distinctus (Brancsik, 1892)

Species of beetle

Caelostomus distinctus is a species of ground beetle in the subfamily Pterostichinae. It was described by Brancsik in 1892.

This species is found in Madagascar.
