= Caelostomus kaboboensis =

Scientific classification
- Kingdom: Animalia
- Phylum: Arthropoda
- Class: Insecta
- Order: Coleoptera
- Suborder: Adephaga
- Family: Carabidae
- Genus: Caelostomus
- Species: C. kaboboensis

Binomial name
- Caelostomus kaboboensis Straneo, 1960

Species of beetle

Caelostomus kaboboensis is a species of ground beetle in the subfamily Pterostichinae. It was described by Straneo in 1960.

This species is found in DR Congo.
