= Caelostomus quadricollis =

Scientific classification
- Domain: Eukaryota
- Kingdom: Animalia
- Phylum: Arthropoda
- Class: Insecta
- Order: Coleoptera
- Suborder: Adephaga
- Family: Carabidae
- Subfamily: Pterostichinae
- Genus: Caelostomus
- Species: C. quadricollis

Binomial name
- Caelostomus quadricollis (Chaudoir, 1878)

Synonyms
- Stomonaxus quadricollis Chaudoir, 1878

Species of beetle

Caelostomus quadricollis is a species in the ground beetle family Carabidae. It is found in DR Congo and Kenya.

This species was described by Maximilien Chaudoir in 1878.
