= Aphaenops bucephalus =

Scientific classification
- Domain: Eukaryota
- Kingdom: Animalia
- Phylum: Arthropoda
- Class: Insecta
- Order: Coleoptera
- Suborder: Adephaga
- Family: Carabidae
- Genus: Aphaenops
- Species: A. bucephalus

Binomial name
- Aphaenops bucephalus Dieck, 1869

Species of beetle

Aphaenops bucephalus is a species of beetle in the subfamily Trechinae. It was described by Dieck in 1869.
