= Caelostomus anthracinus =

Scientific classification
- Domain: Eukaryota
- Kingdom: Animalia
- Phylum: Arthropoda
- Class: Insecta
- Order: Coleoptera
- Suborder: Adephaga
- Family: Carabidae
- Genus: Caelostomus
- Species: C. anthracinus

Binomial name
- Caelostomus anthracinus (Klug, 1833)

Species of beetle

Caelostomus anthracinus is a species of ground beetle in the subfamily Pterostichinae. It was described by Johann Christoph Friedrich Klug in 1833.

This species is found in Madagascar.
