= Caelostomus ebeninus =

Scientific classification
- Domain: Eukaryota
- Kingdom: Animalia
- Phylum: Arthropoda
- Class: Insecta
- Order: Coleoptera
- Suborder: Adephaga
- Family: Carabidae
- Genus: Caelostomus
- Species: C. ebeninus

Binomial name
- Caelostomus ebeninus (Klug, 1832)

Species of beetle

Caelostomus ebeninus is a species of ground beetle in the subfamily Pterostichinae. It was described by Johann Christoph Friedrich Klug in 1832.

This species is found in Madagascar.
