= Caelostomus elaphroides =

Scientific classification
- Kingdom: Animalia
- Phylum: Arthropoda
- Class: Insecta
- Order: Coleoptera
- Suborder: Adephaga
- Family: Carabidae
- Genus: Caelostomus
- Species: C. elaphroides

Binomial name
- Caelostomus elaphroides Straneo, 1949

Species of beetle

Caelostomus elaphroides is a species of ground beetle in the subfamily Pterostichinae. It was described by Straneo in 1949.

This species is found in DR Congo.
