= Caelostomus howa =

Scientific classification
- Domain: Eukaryota
- Kingdom: Animalia
- Phylum: Arthropoda
- Class: Insecta
- Order: Coleoptera
- Suborder: Adephaga
- Family: Carabidae
- Genus: Caelostomus
- Species: C. howa

Binomial name
- Caelostomus howa (Tschitscherine, 1898)

Species of beetle

Caelostomus howa is a species of ground beetle in the subfamily Pterostichinae. It was described by Tschitscherine in 1898.

This species is found in Madagascar.
