= Caelostomus intermedius =

Scientific classification
- Domain: Eukaryota
- Kingdom: Animalia
- Phylum: Arthropoda
- Class: Insecta
- Order: Coleoptera
- Suborder: Adephaga
- Family: Carabidae
- Genus: Caelostomus
- Species: C. intermedius

Binomial name
- Caelostomus intermedius (Chaudoir, 1878)

Species of beetle

Caelostomus intermedius is a species of ground beetle in the subfamily Pterostichinae. It was described by Maximilien Chaudoir in 1878.

This species is found in Africa.
