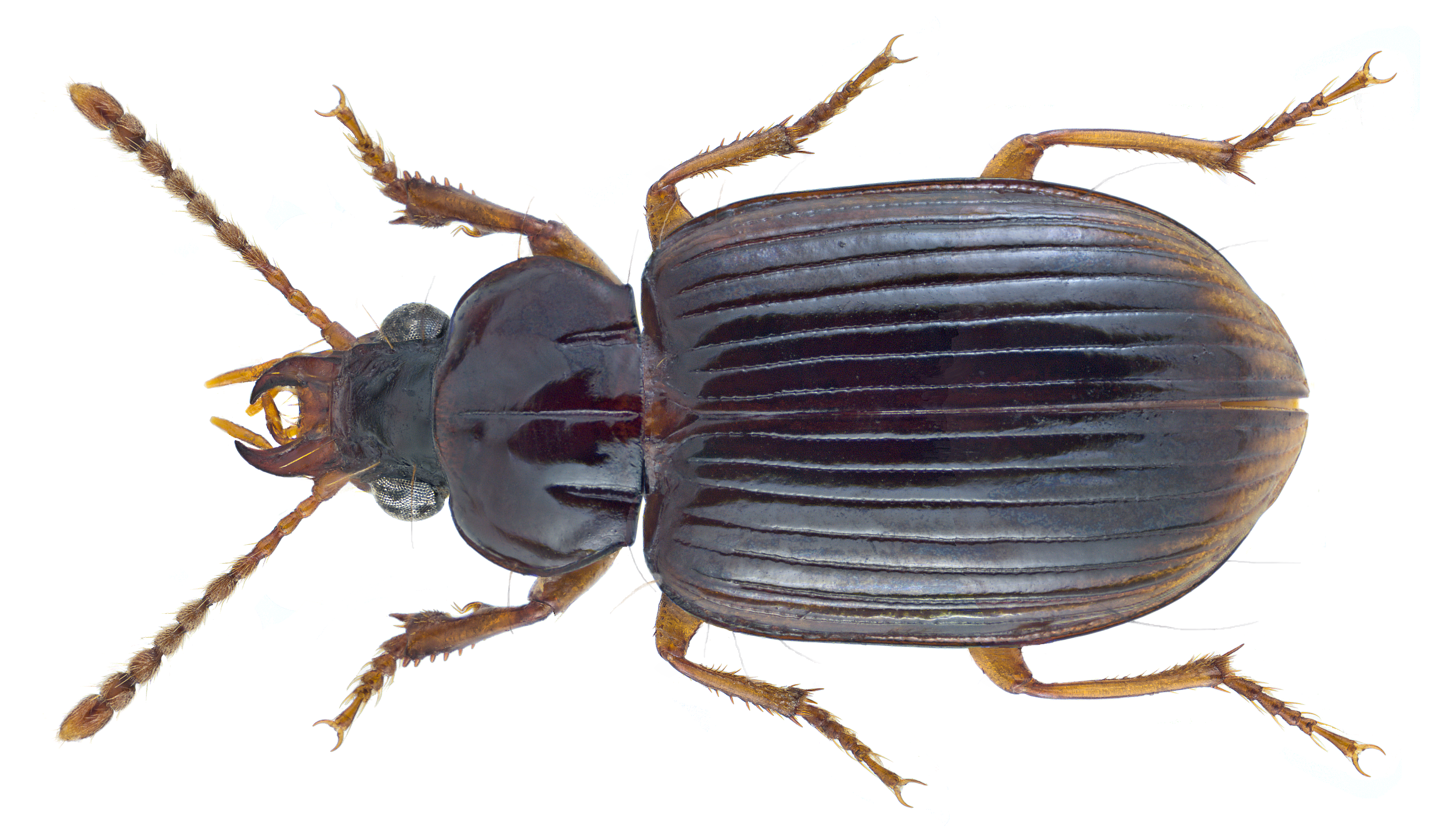
- Caelostomus picipes

Scientific classification
- Domain: Eukaryota
- Kingdom: Animalia
- Phylum: Arthropoda
- Class: Insecta
- Order: Coleoptera
- Suborder: Adephaga
- Family: Carabidae
- Subfamily: Pterostichinae
- Genus: Caelostomus; W.S. MacLeay, 1825

= Caelostomus =

Genus of beetles

Caelostomus is a genus of beetles in the family Carabidae. It contains the following species:

== Species ==
These 162 species belong to the genus Caelostomus:

- Caelostomus abruptus Jordan, 1894 (Indonesia)
- Caelostomus agilis Straneo, 1979 (Congo)
- Caelostomus albertisi Straneo, 1938 (Indonesia, New Guinea, Australia)
- Caelostomus alluaudi Jeannel, 1948 (Madagascar)
- Caelostomus amaroides (Boheman, 1848) (Africa)
- Caelostomus ambiguus (Tschitscherine, 1900) (Madagascar)
- Caelostomus ambreanus Jeannel, 1948 (Madagascar)
- Caelostomus anceps (Tschitscherine, 1903) (Madagascar)
- Caelostomus andamanensis Straneo, 1938 (India)
- Caelostomus andrewesi Straneo, 1938 (Indonesia)
- Caelostomus anthracinus (Klug, 1833) (Madagascar)
- Caelostomus assiniensis (Tschitscherine, 1899) (Guinea, Sierra Leone, Ivory Coast)
- Caelostomus basalis (Alluaud, 1897) (Madagascar)
- Caelostomus basilewskyi Straneo, 1948 (Cameroon)
- Caelostomus birmanicus Straneo, 1938 (Myanmar)
- Caelostomus brevimarginatus Straneo, 1941 (Africa)
- Caelostomus burgeoni Straneo, 1941 (Africa)
- Caelostomus buruanus Straneo, 1939 (Indonesia)
- Caelostomus caprai Straneo, 1938 (Indonesia, Borneo)
- Caelostomus castaneus Straneo, 1941 (DR Congo, Uganda, Tanzania, Malawi)
- Caelostomus castanopterus Straneo, 1942 (DR Congo, Kenya)
- Caelostomus catalai Jeannel, 1948 (Madagascar)
- Caelostomus chujoi (Jedlicka, 1961) (Cambodia)
- Caelostomus colasi Straneo, 1940 (Madagascar)
- Caelostomus congoensis (Tschitscherine, 1898) (DR Congo)
- Caelostomus congruus (Tschitscherine, 1903) (Madagascar)
- Caelostomus convexidorsis Straneo, 1938 (Indonesia)
- Caelostomus convexior Jordan, 1894 (Indonesia)
- Caelostomus convexiusculus (Tschitscherine, 1899) (Madagascar)
- Caelostomus coomani Straneo, 1938 (Vietnam)
- Caelostomus cordicollis Straneo, 1938 (Malaysia)
- Caelostomus crenulipennis Straneo, 1938 (Thailand)
- Caelostomus cribratellus Straneo, 1956 (DR Congo, Burundi)
- Caelostomus cribratus Jeannel, 1948 (Madagascar)
- Caelostomus cribrifrons (Chaudoir, 1873) (Gabon)
- Caelostomus cribriventris Straneo, 1938 (Vietnam)
- Caelostomus debeauxi Straneo, 1938 (Indonesia, Borneo, Philippines)
- Caelostomus difficilis Straneo, 1955 (DR Congo)
- Caelostomus distinctus (Brancsik, 1892) (Madagascar)
- Caelostomus drescheri Straneo, 1938 (Indonesia)
- Caelostomus ebeninus (Klug, 1833) (Madagascar)
- Caelostomus elaphroides Straneo, 1949 (DR Congo)
- Caelostomus elegans Straneo, 1938 (Indonesia)
- Caelostomus elongatulus Straneo, 1938 (Indonesia)
- Caelostomus euglyptus (Bates, 1888)
- Caelostomus explanatus (Bates, 1888) (Guinea, Equatorial Guinea, DR Congo)
- Caelostomus feai Straneo, 1938 (Myanmar)
- Caelostomus gerardi Burgeon, 1935 (DR Congo)
- Caelostomus ghesquierei (Burgeon, 1935) (Ghana, DR Congo)
- Caelostomus globosus Jeannel, 1948 (Madagascar)
- Caelostomus globulipennis Straneo, 1950 (DR Congo)
- Caelostomus howa (Tschitscherine, 1898) (Madagascar)
- Caelostomus humerosus (Tschitscherine, 1898) (Madagascar)
- Caelostomus humilis (Tschitscherine, 1903) (Madagascar)
- Caelostomus immarginatus Straneo, 1938 (Benin, Cameroon, DR Congo)
- Caelostomus inermis (Bates, 1892) (India, Myanmar, Thailand)
- Caelostomus intermedius (Chaudoir, 1878) (Africa)
- Caelostomus iridescens Andrewes, 1929 (Indonesia)
- Caelostomus isakae Jeannel, 1948 (Madagascar)
- Caelostomus julianae Straneo, 1950 (DR Congo)
- Caelostomus kaboboensis Straneo, 1960 (DR Congo)
- Caelostomus kaszabi (Jedlicka, 1954) (Taiwan)
- Caelostomus kivuanus Straneo, 1955 (DR Congo)
- Caelostomus klugii (Fairmaire, 1869) (Madagascar)
- Caelostomus laevisulcis Straneo, 1956 (DR Congo)
- Caelostomus latemarginatus Straneo, 1938 (Cambodia, Laos, Vietnam)
- Caelostomus latithorax Straneo, 1938 (Indonesia)
- Caelostomus latus Kavanaugh & Rainio, 2016 (Madagascar)
- Caelostomus leleupi Straneo, 1955 (Ivory Coast, DR Congo, Kenya, Burundi)
- Caelostomus longicornis Straneo, 1960 (DR Congo)
- Caelostomus longinquus Straneo, 1938 (Laos)
- Caelostomus longissimus Straneo, 1951 (Vietnam)
- Caelostomus longisulcatus Straneo, 1952 (Guinea)
- Caelostomus longulus (Bates, 1889) (Africa)
- Caelostomus loriai Straneo, 1938 (New Guinea)
- Caelostomus louwerensi Straneo, 1938 (Indonesia)
- Caelostomus malayanus Straneo, 1938 (Malaysia)
- Caelostomus malvernensis Straneo, 1942 (South Africa)
- Caelostomus mariae Straneo, 1938 (Indonesia)
- Caelostomus masisianus Straneo, 1955 (DR Congo)
- Caelostomus minimus Straneo, 1941 (Nigeria, Equatorial Guinea)
- Caelostomus minor Jordan, 1894 (Indonesia)
- Caelostomus minusculus Straneo, 1940 (Madagascar)
- Caelostomus minutissimus Jeannel, 1948 (Madagascar)
- Caelostomus miser Straneo, 1942 (Equatorial Guinea)
- Caelostomus modiglianii Straneo, 1938 (Indonesia)
- Caelostomus monardi Straneo, 1951 (Cameroon)
- Caelostomus montanus Andrewes, 1931 (Indonesia, Borneo)
- Caelostomus natalensis (Péringuey, 1896) (South Africa)
- Caelostomus nigerrimus Straneo, 1938 (Vietnam)
- Caelostomus nitidus Straneo, 1938 (Laos, Vietnam)
- Caelostomus novaebritanniae (Fairmaire, 1883)
- Caelostomus novaeguineae Straneo, 1938 (New Guinea)
- Caelostomus nyassae Straneo, 1941 (Tanzania, Malawi)
- Caelostomus oberthueri Straneo, 1938 (Indonesia)
- Caelostomus oblongus Straneo, 1940 (Madagascar)
- Caelostomus obscuripes Straneo, 1938 (India)
- Caelostomus obtusus Straneo, 1938 (Indonesia, Borneo, Philippines)
- Caelostomus ovalipennis Straneo, 1938 (Malaysia)
- Caelostomus parallelicollis Straneo, 1941 (Guinea-Bissau)
- Caelostomus parallelipennis Straneo, 1938 (Indonesia)
- Caelostomus parallelopipedus Straneo, 1938 (Indonesia, Borneo)
- Caelostomus parvulus (Tschitscherine, 1899) (Africa)
- Caelostomus pavidus (LaFerté-Sénectère, 1853) (Africa)
- Caelostomus peninsularis Straneo, 1938 (India)
- Caelostomus perakianus Straneo, 1938 (Malaysia)
- Caelostomus perrieri Jeannel, 1948 (Madagascar)
- Caelostomus philippinicus Straneo, 1938 (Philippines)
- Caelostomus picipes (W.S.MacLeay, 1825) (south, southeast, and east Asia)
- Caelostomus planoculatus Jeannel, 1948
- Caelostomus planulus Straneo, 1942 (DR Congo, Kenya)
- Caelostomus procerulus (Tschitscherine, 1900) (Madagascar, the Comoro Islands)
- Caelostomus profundestriatus Straneo, 1941 (Equatorial Guinea)
- Caelostomus propinquus Straneo, 1938 (Indonesia)
- Caelostomus proximoides Straneo, 1955 (DR Congo)
- Caelostomus proximus Straneo, 1955 (DR Congo)
- Caelostomus pseudocongoensis Straneo, 1939 (DR Congo)
- Caelostomus pseudoparvus Straneo, 1942 (DR Congo)
- Caelostomus pumilio (Tschitscherine, 1903) (Madagascar)
- Caelostomus punctatissimus Straneo, 1938 (Malaysia, Singapore)
- Caelostomus punctifrons (Chaudoir, 1850) (Africa)
- Caelostomus punctisternus Straneo, 1938 (Cameroon)
- Caelostomus punctulatus (Tschitscherine, 1899) (Africa)
- Caelostomus pusillus Straneo, 1938 (Indonesia, Borneo)
- Caelostomus quadricollis (Chaudoir, 1878) (DR Congo, Kenya)
- Caelostomus rectangulus (Chaudoir, 1873) (Southeast Asia)
- Caelostomus rectibasis Straneo, 1973 (Madagascar)
- Caelostomus rotundicollis Straneo, 1948 (Kenya)
- Caelostomus rotundiformis Kavanaugh & Rainio, 2016 (Madagascar)
- Caelostomus ruber Andrewes, 1922 (India)
- Caelostomus rubripes Straneo, 1955 (DR Congo)
- Caelostomus sarawakianus Straneo, 1938 (Indonesia, Borneo)
- Caelostomus sculptilis (Tschitscherine, 1901) (Cameroon, Central African Republic, DR Congo)
- Caelostomus sculptipennis (Motschulsky, 1860) (Sri Lanka, India)
- Caelostomus semenowi (Tschitscherine, 1898)
- Caelostomus siamensis Straneo, 1938 (Thailand)
- Caelostomus similis Jordan, 1894 (Indonesia)
- Caelostomus simulator Straneo, 1955 (DR Congo)
- Caelostomus singaporensis Straneo, 1938 (Singapore)
- Caelostomus spurius (Péringuey, 1926) (South Africa)
- Caelostomus stevensoni Straneo, 1941 (Zimbabwe)
- Caelostomus straneoi Darlington, 1962 (New Guinea)
- Caelostomus striatocollis (Dejean, 1831) (Africa)
- Caelostomus stricticollis Straneo, 1938 (Indonesia, Borneo)
- Caelostomus subconvexus Straneo, 1995 (South Africa)
- Caelostomus subiridescens Straneo, 1938 (Indonesia)
- Caelostomus subovatus Straneo, 1938 (Malaysia)
- Caelostomus subparallelicollis Straneo, 1948 (Guinea, Gabon)
- Caelostomus subparallelus Straneo, 1941 (Africa)
- Caelostomus subquadricollis Straneo, 1942 (Tanzania)
- Caelostomus subsinuatus (Chaudoir, 1883) (Indonesia, New Guinea, Australia)
- Caelostomus substriatus Straneo, 1940 (Madagascar)
- Caelostomus sulcatissimus Straneo, 1938 (India)
- Caelostomus sumatrensis Andrewes, 1929 (Indonesia, Borneo)
- Caelostomus thoracicus Straneo, 1942 (Sierra Leone, Ivory Coast, DR Congo, Rwanda)
- Caelostomus tschitscherini Burgeon, 1935 (DR Congo)
- Caelostomus uelensis Burgeon, 1935 (DR Congo)
- Caelostomus validiusculus (Tschitscherine, 1899) (Guinea, Ivory Coast, DR Congo)
- Caelostomus validulus (Tschitscherine, 1903) (Madagascar)
- Caelostomus variabilis Straneo, 1955 (DR Congo)
- Caelostomus villiersi Straneo, 1967 (Congo)
- Caelostomus zanzibaricus (Chaudoir, 1878) (Tanzania, Madagascar, the Comoro Islands)
