= Aphaenops bessoni =

Scientific classification
- Kingdom: Animalia
- Phylum: Arthropoda
- Class: Insecta
- Order: Coleoptera
- Suborder: Adephaga
- Family: Carabidae
- Genus: Aphaenops
- Species: A. bessoni

Binomial name
- Aphaenops bessoni Cabidoche, 1962

Species of beetle

Aphaenops bessoni is a species of beetle in the subfamily Trechinae. It was described by Cabidoche in 1962.
