= Caelostomus subparallelus =

Scientific classification
- Kingdom: Animalia
- Phylum: Arthropoda
- Class: Insecta
- Order: Coleoptera
- Suborder: Adephaga
- Family: Carabidae
- Subfamily: Pterostichinae
- Genus: Caelostomus
- Species: C. subparallelus

Binomial name
- Caelostomus subparallelus Straneo, 1941

Species of beetle

Caelostomus subparallelus is a species in the ground beetle family Carabidae. It is found in DR Congo, Tanzania, Zambia, Zimbabwe, and South Africa.

== Subspecies ==
These two subspecies belong to the species Caelostomus subparallelus:

- Caelostomus subparallelus subparallelus Straneo, 1941 (the Democratic Republic of the Congo, Zambia, Zimbabwe, and South Africa)
- Caelostomus subparallelus ukerewianus Straneo, 1942 (Tanzania)
