= Aphaenops jauzioni =

Scientific classification
- Domain: Eukaryota
- Kingdom: Animalia
- Phylum: Arthropoda
- Class: Insecta
- Order: Coleoptera
- Suborder: Adephaga
- Family: Carabidae
- Genus: Aphaenops
- Species: A. jauzioni

Binomial name
- Aphaenops jauzioni Faille, Deliot & Queinnec, 2007

Species of beetle

Aphaenops jauzioni is a species of beetle in the subfamily Trechinae. It was described by Faille, Deliot & Queinnec in 2007.
