= Caelostomus iridescens =

Scientific classification
- Domain: Eukaryota
- Kingdom: Animalia
- Phylum: Arthropoda
- Class: Insecta
- Order: Coleoptera
- Suborder: Adephaga
- Family: Carabidae
- Genus: Caelostomus
- Species: C. iridescens

Binomial name
- Caelostomus iridescens Andrewes, 1929

Species of beetle

Caelostomus iridescens is a species of ground beetle in the subfamily Pterostichinae. It was described by Andrewes in 1929.

This species is found in Indonesia.
