= Caelostomus inermis =

Scientific classification
- Domain: Eukaryota
- Kingdom: Animalia
- Phylum: Arthropoda
- Class: Insecta
- Order: Coleoptera
- Suborder: Adephaga
- Family: Carabidae
- Genus: Caelostomus
- Species: C. inermis

Binomial name
- Caelostomus inermis Bates, 1892

Species of beetle

Caelostomus inermis is a species of ground beetle in the subfamily Pterostichinae. It was described by Henry Walter Bates in 1892.

This species is found in India, Myanmar, and Thailand.
