= Aphaenops rhadamanthus =

Scientific classification
- Domain: Eukaryota
- Kingdom: Animalia
- Phylum: Arthropoda
- Class: Insecta
- Order: Coleoptera
- Suborder: Adephaga
- Family: Carabidae
- Subfamily: Trechinae
- Genus: Aphaenops
- Species: A. rhadamanthus

Binomial name
- Aphaenops rhadamanthus (Linder, 1860)

Synonyms
- Aphaenops coiffaitianus

Species of beetle

Aphaenops rhadamanthus is a species in the beetle family Carabidae. It is found in France.

== Subspecies ==
These two subspecies belong to the species Aphaenops rhadamanthus:

- Aphaenops rhadamanthus rhadamanthus (Linder, 1860)
- Aphaenops rhadamanthus silvaticus Jeannel, 1941
