= Caelostomus montanus =

Scientific classification
- Kingdom: Animalia
- Phylum: Arthropoda
- Class: Insecta
- Order: Coleoptera
- Suborder: Adephaga
- Family: Carabidae
- Subfamily: Pterostichinae
- Genus: Caelostomus
- Species: C. montanus

Binomial name
- Caelostomus montanus Andrewes, 1931

Species of beetle

Caelostomus montanus is a species in the ground beetle family Carabidae. It is found in Indonesia and Borneo.

== Subspecies ==
These two subspecies belong to the species Caelostomus montanus:

- Caelostomus montanus laevis Straneo in Louwerens, 1964 (Indonesia and Borneo)
- Caelostomus montanus montanus Andrewes, 1931 (Indonesia and Borneo)
