= Aphaenops bonneti =

Scientific classification
- Domain: Eukaryota
- Kingdom: Animalia
- Phylum: Arthropoda
- Class: Insecta
- Order: Coleoptera
- Suborder: Adephaga
- Family: Carabidae
- Genus: Aphaenops
- Species: A. bonneti

Binomial name
- Aphaenops bonneti Foures, 1948

Synonyms
- Aphaenops delbreili

Species of beetle

Aphaenops bonneti is a species of beetle in the subfamily Trechinae. It was described by Foures in 1948.
