= Caelostomus natalensis =

Scientific classification
- Kingdom: Animalia
- Phylum: Arthropoda
- Class: Insecta
- Order: Coleoptera
- Suborder: Adephaga
- Family: Carabidae
- Subfamily: Pterostichinae
- Genus: Caelostomus
- Species: C. natalensis

Binomial name
- Caelostomus natalensis (Péringuey, 1896)

Synonyms
- Drimostoma natalense Péringuey, 1896

Species of beetle

Caelostomus natalensis is a species in the ground beetle family Carabidae. It is found in South Africa.
