= Caelostomus validulus =

Scientific classification
- Domain: Eukaryota
- Kingdom: Animalia
- Phylum: Arthropoda
- Class: Insecta
- Order: Coleoptera
- Suborder: Adephaga
- Family: Carabidae
- Subfamily: Pterostichinae
- Genus: Caelostomus
- Species: C. validulus

Binomial name
- Caelostomus validulus (Tschitscherine, 1903)

Synonyms
- Drimostoma validulum Tschitscherine, 1903

Species of beetle

Caelostomus validulus is a species in the ground beetle family Carabidae. It is found in Madagascar.
