= Caelostomus punctulatus =

Scientific classification
- Domain: Eukaryota
- Kingdom: Animalia
- Phylum: Arthropoda
- Class: Insecta
- Order: Coleoptera
- Suborder: Adephaga
- Family: Carabidae
- Subfamily: Pterostichinae
- Genus: Caelostomus
- Species: C. punctulatus

Binomial name
- Caelostomus punctulatus (Tschitscherine, 1899)

Synonyms
- Caelostomus fatuus (Tschitscherine, 1900); Drimostoma fatuum Tschitscherine, 1900; Drimostoma punctulatum Tschitscherine, 1899

Species of beetle

Caelostomus punctulatus is a species in the ground beetle family Carabidae. It is found in Africa.
