= Caelostomus assiniensis =

Scientific classification
- Domain: Eukaryota
- Kingdom: Animalia
- Phylum: Arthropoda
- Class: Insecta
- Order: Coleoptera
- Suborder: Adephaga
- Family: Carabidae
- Genus: Caelostomus
- Species: C. assiniensis

Binomial name
- Caelostomus assiniensis (Tschitscherine, 1899)

Species of beetle

Caelostomus assiniensis is a species of ground beetle in the subfamily Pterostichinae. It was described by Tschitscherine in 1899.

This species is found in Guinea, Sierra Leone, and Ivory Coast.
