= Caelostomus sulcatissimus =

Scientific classification
- Kingdom: Animalia
- Phylum: Arthropoda
- Class: Insecta
- Order: Coleoptera
- Suborder: Adephaga
- Family: Carabidae
- Subfamily: Pterostichinae
- Genus: Caelostomus
- Species: C. sulcatissimus

Binomial name
- Caelostomus sulcatissimus Straneo, 1938

Species of beetle

Caelostomus sulcatissimus is a species in the ground beetle family Carabidae. It is found in India.
