= Aphaenops hidalgoi =

Scientific classification
- Domain: Eukaryota
- Kingdom: Animalia
- Phylum: Arthropoda
- Class: Insecta
- Order: Coleoptera
- Suborder: Adephaga
- Family: Carabidae
- Genus: Aphaenops
- Species: A. hidalgoi

Binomial name
- Aphaenops hidalgoi Espanol & Camas, 1985

Species of beetle

Aphaenops hidalgoi is a species of beetle in the subfamily Trechinae. It was described by Espanol & Camas in 1985.
