= Aphaenops jeanneli =

Scientific classification
- Domain: Eukaryota
- Kingdom: Animalia
- Phylum: Arthropoda
- Class: Insecta
- Order: Coleoptera
- Suborder: Adephaga
- Family: Carabidae
- Genus: Aphaenops
- Species: A. jeanneli

Binomial name
- Aphaenops jeanneli Abeille de Perrin, 1905

Species of beetle

Aphaenops jeanneli is a species of beetle in the subfamily Trechinae. It was described by Abeille de Perrin in 1905.
