= Caelostomus validiusculus =

Scientific classification
- Domain: Eukaryota
- Kingdom: Animalia
- Phylum: Arthropoda
- Class: Insecta
- Order: Coleoptera
- Suborder: Adephaga
- Family: Carabidae
- Subfamily: Pterostichinae
- Genus: Caelostomus
- Species: C. validiusculus

Binomial name
- Caelostomus validiusculus (Tschitscherine, 1899)

Synonyms
- Drimostoma validiusculum Tschitscherine, 1899

Species of beetle

Caelostomus validiusculus is a species in the ground beetle family Carabidae. It is found in Guinea, Ivory Coast, and DR Congo.
