= Caelostomus novaebritanniae =

Scientific classification
- Kingdom: Animalia
- Phylum: Arthropoda
- Class: Insecta
- Order: Coleoptera
- Suborder: Adephaga
- Family: Carabidae
- Subfamily: Pterostichinae
- Genus: Caelostomus
- Species: C. novaebritanniae

Binomial name
- Caelostomus novaebritanniae (Fairmaire, 1883)

Synonyms
- Drimostoma novaebritanniae Fairmaire, 1883

Species of beetle

Caelostomus novaebritanniae is a species in the ground beetle family Carabidae.
