= Caelostomus klugii =

Scientific classification
- Kingdom: Animalia
- Phylum: Arthropoda
- Class: Insecta
- Order: Coleoptera
- Suborder: Adephaga
- Family: Carabidae
- Genus: Caelostomus
- Species: C. klugii

Binomial name
- Caelostomus klugii (Fairmaire, 1868)

Species of beetle

Caelostomus klugii is a species of ground beetle in the subfamily Pterostichinae. It was described by Fairmaire in 1868.

This species is found in Madagascar.
