= Caelostomus rectangulus =

Scientific classification
- Domain: Eukaryota
- Kingdom: Animalia
- Phylum: Arthropoda
- Class: Insecta
- Order: Coleoptera
- Suborder: Adephaga
- Family: Carabidae
- Subfamily: Pterostichinae
- Genus: Caelostomus
- Species: C. rectangulus

Binomial name
- Caelostomus rectangulus (Chaudoir, 1873)

Synonyms
- Drimostoma rectangulum Chaudoir, 1873

Species of beetle

Caelostomus rectangulus is a species in the ground beetle family Carabidae. It is found in Southeast Asia.

This species was described by Maximilien Chaudoir in 1873.
