= Caelostomus colasi =

Scientific classification
- Kingdom: Animalia
- Phylum: Arthropoda
- Class: Insecta
- Order: Coleoptera
- Suborder: Adephaga
- Family: Carabidae
- Genus: Caelostomus
- Species: C. colasi

Binomial name
- Caelostomus colasi Straneo, 1940

Species of beetle

Caelostomus colasi is a species of ground beetle in the subfamily Pterostichinae. It was described by Straneo in 1940.

This species is found in Madagascar.
