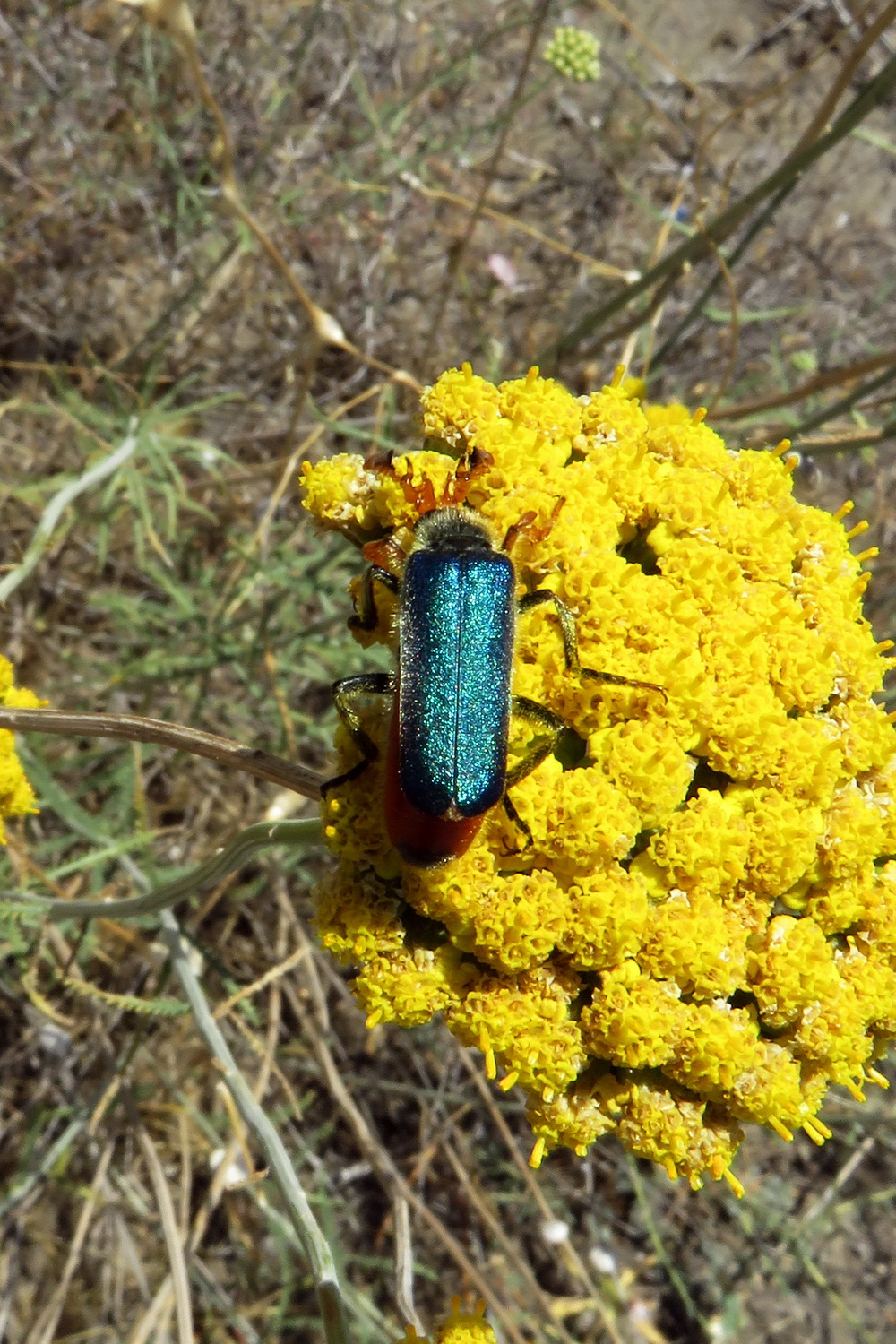

Scientific classification
- Domain: Eukaryota
- Kingdom: Animalia
- Phylum: Arthropoda
- Class: Insecta
- Order: Coleoptera
- Suborder: Polyphaga
- Infraorder: Cucujiformia
- Family: Meloidae
- Genus: Cerocoma
- Species: C. festiva

Binomial name
- Cerocoma festiva Faldermann, 1837

= Cerocoma festiva =

Species of beetle

Cerocoma festiva is a species of blister beetle in the family Meloidae.
