= Caelostomus punctifrons =

Scientific classification
- Kingdom: Animalia
- Phylum: Arthropoda
- Clade: Pancrustacea
- Class: Insecta
- Order: Coleoptera
- Suborder: Adephaga
- Family: Carabidae
- Genus: Caelostomus
- Species: C. punctifrons

Binomial name
- Caelostomus punctifrons (Chaudoir, 1850)

Species of beetle

Caelostomus punctifrons is a species of ground beetle. It was described by Maximilien Chaudoir in 1850. It occurs in Sub-Saharan Africa and has been introduced to Jamaica.
