= Caelostomus gerardi =

Scientific classification
- Kingdom: Animalia
- Phylum: Arthropoda
- Class: Insecta
- Order: Coleoptera
- Suborder: Adephaga
- Family: Carabidae
- Genus: Caelostomus
- Species: C. gerardi

Binomial name
- Caelostomus gerardi Burgeon, 1935

Species of beetle

Caelostomus gerardi is a species of ground beetle in the subfamily Pterostichinae. It was described by Burgeon in 1935.

This species is found in DR Congo.
