= Caelostomus humilis =

Scientific classification
- Domain: Eukaryota
- Kingdom: Animalia
- Phylum: Arthropoda
- Class: Insecta
- Order: Coleoptera
- Suborder: Adephaga
- Family: Carabidae
- Genus: Caelostomus
- Species: C. humilis

Binomial name
- Caelostomus humilis (Tschitscherine, 1903)

Species of beetle

Caelostomus humilis is a species of ground beetle in the subfamily Pterostichinae. It was described by Tschitscherine in 1903.

This species is found in Madagascar.
