= Caelostomus longulus =

Scientific classification
- Domain: Eukaryota
- Kingdom: Animalia
- Phylum: Arthropoda
- Class: Insecta
- Order: Coleoptera
- Suborder: Adephaga
- Family: Carabidae
- Subfamily: Pterostichinae
- Genus: Caelostomus
- Species: C. longulus

Binomial name
- Caelostomus longulus (Bates, 1889)

Synonyms
- Stomonaxus longulus Bates, 1889

Species of beetle

Caelostomus longulus is a species in the ground beetle family Carabidae. It is found in Africa.

== Subspecies ==
These two subspecies belong to the species Caelostomus longulus:

- Caelostomus longulus longulus (Bates, 1889)
- Caelostomus longulus sinuatus Straneo, 1946
