= Caelostomus explanatus =

Scientific classification
- Domain: Eukaryota
- Kingdom: Animalia
- Phylum: Arthropoda
- Class: Insecta
- Order: Coleoptera
- Suborder: Adephaga
- Family: Carabidae
- Genus: Caelostomus
- Species: C. explanatus

Binomial name
- Caelostomus explanatus (Bates, 1888)

Species of beetle

Caelostomus explanatus is a species of ground beetle in the subfamily Pterostichinae. It was described by Henry Walter Bates in 1888.

This species is found in Guinea, Equatorial Guinea, and DR Congo.
