= Caelostomus chujoi =

Scientific classification
- Domain: Eukaryota
- Kingdom: Animalia
- Phylum: Arthropoda
- Class: Insecta
- Order: Coleoptera
- Suborder: Adephaga
- Family: Carabidae
- Genus: Caelostomus
- Species: C. chujoi

Binomial name
- Caelostomus chujoi (Jedlicka, 1961)

Species of beetle

Caelostomus chujoi is a species of ground beetle in the subfamily Pterostichinae. It was described by Jedlicka in 1961.

This species is found in Cambodia.
