= Aphaenops catalonicus =

Scientific classification
- Domain: Eukaryota
- Kingdom: Animalia
- Phylum: Arthropoda
- Class: Insecta
- Order: Coleoptera
- Suborder: Adephaga
- Family: Carabidae
- Genus: Aphaenops
- Species: A. catalonicus

Binomial name
- Aphaenops catalonicus Escola & Cancio, 1983

Species of beetle

Aphaenops catalonicus is a species of beetle in the subfamily Trechinae. It was described by Escola & Cancio in 1983.
