= Caelostomus cribratellus =

Scientific classification
- Kingdom: Animalia
- Phylum: Arthropoda
- Class: Insecta
- Order: Coleoptera
- Suborder: Adephaga
- Family: Carabidae
- Genus: Caelostomus
- Species: C. cribratellus

Binomial name
- Caelostomus cribratellus Straneo, 1956

Species of beetle

Caelostomus cribratellus is a species of ground beetle in the subfamily Pterostichinae. It is found in DR Congo and Burundi.

This species is found in DR Congo and Burundi.
