= Aphaenops leschenaulti =

Scientific classification
- Domain: Eukaryota
- Kingdom: Animalia
- Phylum: Arthropoda
- Class: Insecta
- Order: Coleoptera
- Suborder: Adephaga
- Family: Carabidae
- Genus: Aphaenops
- Species: A. leschenaulti

Binomial name
- Aphaenops leschenaulti Bonvouloir, 1862

Species of beetle

Aphaenops leschenaulti is a species of beetle in the subfamily Trechinae. It was described by Bonvouloir in 1862.
