= Aphaenops fresnedai =

Scientific classification
- Domain: Eukaryota
- Kingdom: Animalia
- Phylum: Arthropoda
- Class: Insecta
- Order: Coleoptera
- Suborder: Adephaga
- Family: Carabidae
- Genus: Aphaenops
- Species: A. fresnedai

Binomial name
- Aphaenops fresnedai Faille & Bourdeau, 2011

Species of beetle

Aphaenops fresnedai is a species of beetle in the subfamily Trechinae. It was described by Faille & Bourdeau in 2011.
