= Caelostomus minor =

Scientific classification
- Domain: Eukaryota
- Kingdom: Animalia
- Phylum: Arthropoda
- Class: Insecta
- Order: Coleoptera
- Suborder: Adephaga
- Family: Carabidae
- Subfamily: Pterostichinae
- Genus: Caelostomus
- Species: C. minor

Binomial name
- Caelostomus minor Jordan, 1894

Species of beetle

Caelostomus minor is a species in the ground beetle family Carabidae. It is found in Indonesia.

== Subspecies ==
These two subspecies belong to the species Caelostomus minor:

- Caelostomus minor insulicola Straneo, 1938 (Indonesia)
- Caelostomus minor minor Jordan, 1894 (Indonesia)
