= Caelostomus amaroides =

Scientific classification
- Kingdom: Animalia
- Phylum: Arthropoda
- Class: Insecta
- Order: Coleoptera
- Suborder: Adephaga
- Family: Carabidae
- Genus: Caelostomus
- Species: C. amaroides

Binomial name
- Caelostomus amaroides (Boheman, 1848)

Species of beetle

Caelostomus amaroides is a species of ground beetle in the subfamily Pterostichinae. It was described by Boheman in 1848.

This species is found in Africa.
