= Caelostomus striatocollis =

Scientific classification
- Kingdom: Animalia
- Phylum: Arthropoda
- Class: Insecta
- Order: Coleoptera
- Suborder: Adephaga
- Family: Carabidae
- Subfamily: Pterostichinae
- Genus: Caelostomus
- Species: C. striatocollis

Binomial name
- Caelostomus striatocollis (Dejean, 1831)

Synonyms
- Drimostoma striatocolle Dejean, 1831

Species of beetle

Caelostomus striatocollis is a species in the ground beetle family Carabidae. It is found in Africa.

This species was described by Pierre François Marie Auguste Dejean in 1831.

== Subspecies ==
These two subspecies belong to the species Caelostomus striatocollis:

- Caelostomus striatocollis aethiopicus Straneo, 1942 (Ethiopia)
- Caelostomus striatocollis striatocollis (Dejean, 1831) (Africa)
