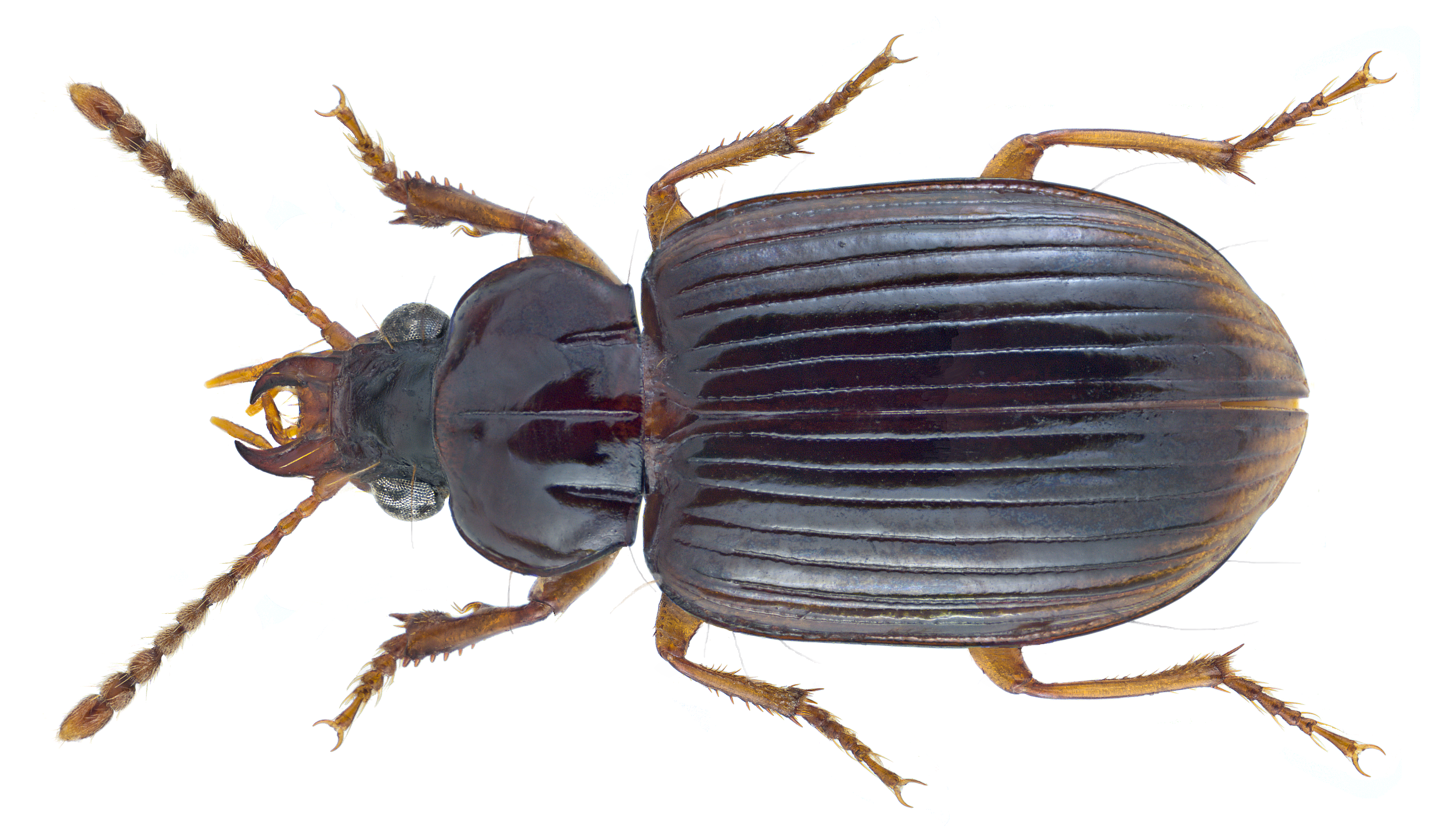

Scientific classification
- Domain: Eukaryota
- Kingdom: Animalia
- Phylum: Arthropoda
- Class: Insecta
- Order: Coleoptera
- Suborder: Adephaga
- Family: Carabidae
- Genus: Caelostomus
- Species: C. picipes

Binomial name
- Caelostomus picipes (W.S. Macleay, 1825)

= Caelostomus picipes =

Species of beetle

Caelostomus picipes is a species of ground beetle in the subfamily Pterostichinae. It was described by W.S.Macleay in 1825. It occurs in Japan.
