= Caelostomus leleupi =

Scientific classification
- Kingdom: Animalia
- Phylum: Arthropoda
- Class: Insecta
- Order: Coleoptera
- Suborder: Adephaga
- Family: Carabidae
- Genus: Caelostomus
- Species: C. leleupi

Binomial name
- Caelostomus leleupi Straneo, 1955

Species of beetle

Caelostomus leleupi is a species of ground beetle in the subfamily Pterostichinae. It was described by Straneo in 1955.

This species is found in Ivory Coast, DR Congo, Kenya, and Burundi.
