= Caelostomus ruber =

Scientific classification
- Domain: Eukaryota
- Kingdom: Animalia
- Phylum: Arthropoda
- Class: Insecta
- Order: Coleoptera
- Suborder: Adephaga
- Family: Carabidae
- Subfamily: Pterostichinae
- Genus: Caelostomus
- Species: C. ruber

Binomial name
- Caelostomus ruber Andrewes, 1922

Species of beetle

Caelostomus ruber is a species in the ground beetle family Carabidae. It is found in India.
