= Caelostomus pavidus =

Scientific classification
- Kingdom: Animalia
- Phylum: Arthropoda
- Class: Insecta
- Order: Coleoptera
- Suborder: Adephaga
- Family: Carabidae
- Subfamily: Pterostichinae
- Genus: Caelostomus
- Species: C. pavidus

Binomial name
- Caelostomus pavidus (LaFerté-Sénectère, 1853)

Synonyms
- Drimostoma pavidum LaFerté-Sénectère, 1853

Species of beetle

Caelostomus pavidus is a species in the ground beetle family Carabidae. It is found in Africa.
