= Caelostomus ambreanus =

Scientific classification
- Domain: Eukaryota
- Kingdom: Animalia
- Phylum: Arthropoda
- Class: Insecta
- Order: Coleoptera
- Suborder: Adephaga
- Family: Carabidae
- Genus: Caelostomus
- Species: C. ambreanus

Binomial name
- Caelostomus ambreanus Jeannel, 1948

Species of beetle

Caelostomus ambreanus is a species of ground beetle in the subfamily Pterostichinae. It was described by Jeannel in 1948.

This species is found in Madagascar.
