= Caelostomus cribriventris =

Scientific classification
- Kingdom: Animalia
- Phylum: Arthropoda
- Class: Insecta
- Order: Coleoptera
- Suborder: Adephaga
- Family: Carabidae
- Genus: Caelostomus
- Species: C. cribriventris

Binomial name
- Caelostomus cribriventris Straneo, 1938

Species of beetle

Caelostomus cribriventris is a species of ground beetle in the subfamily Pterostichinae. It was described by Straneo in 1938.

This species is found in Vietnam.
