= Aphaenops laurenti =

Scientific classification
- Domain: Eukaryota
- Kingdom: Animalia
- Phylum: Arthropoda
- Class: Insecta
- Order: Coleoptera
- Suborder: Adephaga
- Family: Carabidae
- Genus: Aphaenops
- Species: A. laurenti

Binomial name
- Aphaenops laurenti Genest, 1983

Species of beetle

Aphaenops laurenti is a species of beetle in the subfamily Trechinae. It was described by Genest in 1983.
