= Caelostomus castanopterus =

Scientific classification
- Kingdom: Animalia
- Phylum: Arthropoda
- Class: Insecta
- Order: Coleoptera
- Suborder: Adephaga
- Family: Carabidae
- Genus: Caelostomus
- Species: C. castanopterus

Binomial name
- Caelostomus castanopterus Straneo, 1942

Species of beetle

Caelostomus castanopterus is a species of ground beetle in the subfamily Pterostichinae. It was described by Straneo in 1942.

This species is found in DR Congo and Kenya.
