= Caelostomus planoculatus =

Scientific classification
- Domain: Eukaryota
- Kingdom: Animalia
- Phylum: Arthropoda
- Class: Insecta
- Order: Coleoptera
- Suborder: Adephaga
- Family: Carabidae
- Subfamily: Pterostichinae
- Genus: Caelostomus
- Species: C. planoculatus

Binomial name
- Caelostomus planoculatus Jeannel, 1948

Species of beetle

Caelostomus planoculatus is a species in the ground beetle family Carabidae.
