= Caelostomus subsinuatus =

Scientific classification
- Domain: Eukaryota
- Kingdom: Animalia
- Phylum: Arthropoda
- Class: Insecta
- Order: Coleoptera
- Suborder: Adephaga
- Family: Carabidae
- Subfamily: Pterostichinae
- Genus: Caelostomus
- Species: C. subsinuatus

Binomial name
- Caelostomus subsinuatus (Chaudoir, 1883)

Synonyms
- Drimostoma subsinuatum Chaudoir, 1883

Species of beetle

Caelostomus subsinuatus is a species in the ground beetle family Carabidae. It is found in Indonesia, New Guinea, and Australia.
