= Aphaenops alberti =

Scientific classification
- Domain: Eukaryota
- Kingdom: Animalia
- Phylum: Arthropoda
- Class: Insecta
- Order: Coleoptera
- Suborder: Adephaga
- Family: Carabidae
- Genus: Aphaenops
- Species: A. alberti

Binomial name
- Aphaenops alberti Jeannel, 1939

Species of beetle

Aphaenops alberti is a species of beetle in the subfamily Trechinae. It was described by Jeannel in 1939.
