= Aphaenops cissauguensis =

Scientific classification
- Kingdom: Animalia
- Phylum: Arthropoda
- Class: Insecta
- Order: Coleoptera
- Suborder: Adephaga
- Family: Carabidae
- Genus: Aphaenops
- Species: A. cissauguensis

Binomial name
- Aphaenops cissauguensis Faille & Bourdeau, 2008

Species of beetle

Aphaenops cissauguensis is a species of beetle in the subfamily Trechinae. It was described by Faille & Bourdeau in 2008.
