= Caelostomus parvulus =

Scientific classification
- Domain: Eukaryota
- Kingdom: Animalia
- Phylum: Arthropoda
- Class: Insecta
- Order: Coleoptera
- Suborder: Adephaga
- Family: Carabidae
- Subfamily: Pterostichinae
- Genus: Caelostomus
- Species: C. parvulus

Binomial name
- Caelostomus parvulus (Tschitscherine, 1899)

Synonyms
- Stomonaxus parvulus Tschitscherine, 1899

Species of beetle

Caelostomus parvulus is a species in the ground beetle family Carabidae. It is found in Guinea, Chad, the Central African Republic, and DR Congo.
