= Caelostomus sculptipennis =

Scientific classification
- Kingdom: Animalia
- Phylum: Arthropoda
- Class: Insecta
- Order: Coleoptera
- Suborder: Adephaga
- Family: Carabidae
- Subfamily: Pterostichinae
- Genus: Caelostomus
- Species: C. sculptipennis

Binomial name
- Caelostomus sculptipennis (Motschulsky, 1860)

Synonyms
- Stomonaxus sculptipennis Motschulsky, 1860

Species of beetle

Caelostomus sculptipennis is a species in the ground beetle family Carabidae. It is found in Sri Lanka and India.

This species was described by Victor Motschulsky in 1860.
