= Aphaenops abodiensis =

Scientific classification
- Domain: Eukaryota
- Kingdom: Animalia
- Phylum: Arthropoda
- Class: Insecta
- Order: Coleoptera
- Suborder: Adephaga
- Family: Carabidae
- Genus: Aphaenops
- Species: A. abodiensis

Binomial name
- Aphaenops abodiensis Dupre, 1988

Species of beetle

Aphaenops abodiensis is a species of beetle in the subfamily Trechinae. It was described by Dupre in 1988.
