= Caelostomus procerulus =

Scientific classification
- Domain: Eukaryota
- Kingdom: Animalia
- Phylum: Arthropoda
- Class: Insecta
- Order: Coleoptera
- Suborder: Adephaga
- Family: Carabidae
- Subfamily: Pterostichinae
- Genus: Caelostomus
- Species: C. procerulus

Binomial name
- Caelostomus procerulus (Tschitscherine, 1900)

Synonyms
- Drimostoma procerulum Tschitscherine, 1900

Species of beetle

Caelostomus procerulus is a species in the ground beetle family Carabidae. It is found in Madagascar and the Comoro Islands.
