= Caelostomus zanzibaricus =

Scientific classification
- Domain: Eukaryota
- Kingdom: Animalia
- Phylum: Arthropoda
- Class: Insecta
- Order: Coleoptera
- Suborder: Adephaga
- Family: Carabidae
- Subfamily: Pterostichinae
- Genus: Caelostomus
- Species: C. zanzibaricus

Binomial name
- Caelostomus zanzibaricus (Chaudoir, 1878)

Synonyms
- Drimostoma zanzibaricum Chaudoir, 1878

Species of beetle

Caelostomus zanzibaricus is a species in the ground beetle family Carabidae. It is found in Tanzania, Madagascar, and the Comoro Islands.

This species was described by Maximilien Chaudoir in 1878.

== Subspecies ==
These two subspecies belong to the species Caelostomus zanzibaricus:

- Caelostomus zanzibaricus amplicollis Jeannel, 1948 (Madagascar)
- Caelostomus zanzibaricus zanzibaricus (Chaudoir, 1878) (Burundi and Tanzania)
