= Aphaenops eskualduna =

Scientific classification
- Domain: Eukaryota
- Kingdom: Animalia
- Phylum: Arthropoda
- Class: Insecta
- Order: Coleoptera
- Suborder: Adephaga
- Family: Carabidae
- Genus: Aphaenops
- Species: A. eskualduna

Binomial name
- Aphaenops eskualduna Coiffait, 1959

Species of beetle

Aphaenops eskualduna is a species of beetle in the subfamily Trechinae. It was described by Coiffait in 1959.
