= Caelostomus similis =

Scientific classification
- Domain: Eukaryota
- Kingdom: Animalia
- Phylum: Arthropoda
- Class: Insecta
- Order: Coleoptera
- Suborder: Adephaga
- Family: Carabidae
- Subfamily: Pterostichinae
- Genus: Caelostomus
- Species: C. similis

Binomial name
- Caelostomus similis Jordan, 1894

Species of beetle

Caelostomus similis is a species in the ground beetle family Carabidae. It is found in Indonesia.

This species was described by Karl Jordan in 1894.
