= Aphaenops crypticola =

Scientific classification
- Domain: Eukaryota
- Kingdom: Animalia
- Phylum: Arthropoda
- Class: Insecta
- Order: Coleoptera
- Suborder: Adephaga
- Family: Carabidae
- Subfamily: Trechinae
- Genus: Aphaenops
- Species: A. crypticola

Binomial name
- Aphaenops crypticola (Linder, 1859)

Synonyms
- Aphaenops bourdeaui

Species of beetle

Aphaenops crypticola is a species in the beetle family Carabidae. It is found in France.

== Subspecies ==
These two subspecies belong to the species Aphaenops crypticola:

- Aphaenops crypticola aeacus (Saulcy, 1864)
- Aphaenops crypticola crypticola (Linder, 1859)
