= Aphaenops =

Scientific classification
- Domain: Eukaryota
- Kingdom: Animalia
- Phylum: Arthropoda
- Class: Insecta
- Order: Coleoptera
- Suborder: Adephaga
- Family: Carabidae
- Subfamily: Trechinae
- Genus: Aphaenops; Bonvouloir, 1862

Synonyms
- Hydraphaenops

Genus of beetles

Aphaenops is a genus of beetles in the family Carabidae, containing the following species: All species in the genus are obligate troglobites, and each species is usually endemic to a single cave system; they are unpigmented, and have no functional eyes.

- Aphaenops abodiensis Dupre, 1988
- Aphaenops alberti Jeannel, 1939
- Aphaenops bessoni Cabidoche, 1962
- Aphaenops bonneti Foures, 1948
- Aphaenops bouilloni Coiffait, 1955
- Aphaenops bourdeaui Coiffait, 1976
- Aphaenops bucephalus Dieck, 1869
- Aphaenops carrerei Coiffait, 1953
- Aphaenops catalonicus Escola & Cancio, 1983
- Aphaenops cerberus Dieck, 1869
- Aphaenops chappuisi Coiffait, 1955
- Aphaenops cissauguensis Faille & Bourdeau, 2008
- Aphaenops coiffaitianus A. Gaudin, 1947
- Aphaenops crypticola Linder, 1859
- Aphaenops delbreili Genest, 1983
- Aphaenops eskualduna Coiffait, 1959
- Aphaenops fresnedai Faille & Bourdeau, 2011
- Aphaenops hidalgoi Espanol & Camas, 1985
- Aphaenops hustachei Jeannel, 1917
- Aphaenops jauzioni Faille, Deliot & Queinnec, 2007
- Aphaenops jeanneli Abeille da Perris, 1905
- Aphaenops laurenti Genest, 1983
- Aphaenops leschenaulti Bonvouloir, 1862
- Aphaenops linderi Jeannel, 1938
- Aphaenops loubensi Jeannel, 1953
- Aphaenops ludovici A. Gaudin, 1935
- Aphaenops mariaerosae Genest, 1983
- Aphaenops mensioni Mascaro, 1976
- Aphaenops michaeli Foures, 1954
- Aphaenops ochsi L. Gaudin, 1925
- Aphaenops orionis Fagniez, 1913
- Aphaenops parallelus Coiffait, 1955
- Aphaenops parvulus Faille, Bourdeau & Fresneda, 2010
- Aphaenops pluto Dieck, 1869
- Aphaenops queffelici Cabidoche, 1966
- Aphaenops rebereti A. Gaudin, 1947
- Aphaenops rhadamanthus Linden, 1860
- Aphaenops sioberae Foures, 1954
- Aphaenops tiresias Piochard de la Brulerie, 1872
- Aphaenops valleti Casale & Genest, 1986
- Aphaenops vandeli Foures, 1954
