= Caelostomus sculptilis =

Scientific classification
- Domain: Eukaryota
- Kingdom: Animalia
- Phylum: Arthropoda
- Class: Insecta
- Order: Coleoptera
- Suborder: Adephaga
- Family: Carabidae
- Subfamily: Pterostichinae
- Genus: Caelostomus
- Species: C. sculptilis

Binomial name
- Caelostomus sculptilis (Tschitscherine, 1901)

Synonyms
- Drimostoma sculptile Tschitscherine, 1901

Species of beetle

Caelostomus sculptilis is a species in the ground beetle family Carabidae. It is found in Cameroon, the Central African Republic, and DR Congo.

== Subspecies ==
These two subspecies belong to the species Caelostomus sculptilis:

- Caelostomus sculptilis depressiusculus Straneo, 1939 (DR Congo)
- Caelostomus sculptilis sculptilis (Tschitscherine, 1901) (Cameroon and the Central African Republic)
