= Aphaenops hustachei =

Scientific classification
- Domain: Eukaryota
- Kingdom: Animalia
- Phylum: Arthropoda
- Class: Insecta
- Order: Coleoptera
- Suborder: Adephaga
- Family: Carabidae
- Genus: Aphaenops
- Species: A. hustachei

Binomial name
- Aphaenops hustachei Jeannel, 1917

Species of beetle

Aphaenops hustachei is a species of beetle in the subfamily Trechinae. It was described by Jeannel in 1917.
