= Aphaenops bouilloni =

Scientific classification
- Domain: Eukaryota
- Kingdom: Animalia
- Phylum: Arthropoda
- Class: Insecta
- Order: Coleoptera
- Suborder: Adephaga
- Family: Carabidae
- Genus: Aphaenops
- Species: A. bouilloni

Binomial name
- Aphaenops bouilloni Coiffait, 1955

Species of beetle

Aphaenops bouilloni is a species of ground beetle in the Trechinae subfamily. It was described by Henri Coiffait in 1955.
