= Caelostomus kaszabi =

Scientific classification
- Domain: Eukaryota
- Kingdom: Animalia
- Phylum: Arthropoda
- Class: Insecta
- Order: Coleoptera
- Suborder: Adephaga
- Family: Carabidae
- Genus: Caelostomus
- Species: C. kaszabi

Binomial name
- Caelostomus kaszabi (Jedlicka, 1954)

Species of beetle

Caelostomus kaszabi is a species of ground beetle in the subfamily Pterostichinae. It was described by Jedlicka in 1954.

This species is found in Taiwan.
