= Caelostomus ghesquierei =

Scientific classification
- Kingdom: Animalia
- Phylum: Arthropoda
- Class: Insecta
- Order: Coleoptera
- Suborder: Adephaga
- Family: Carabidae
- Genus: Caelostomus
- Species: C. ghesquierei

Binomial name
- Caelostomus ghesquierei (Burgeon, 1935)

Species of beetle

Caelostomus ghesquierei is a species of ground beetle in the subfamily Pterostichinae. It was described by Burgeon in 1935.

This species is found in Ghana and DR Congo.
