= Caelostomus crenulipennis =

Scientific classification
- Kingdom: Animalia
- Phylum: Arthropoda
- Class: Insecta
- Order: Coleoptera
- Suborder: Adephaga
- Family: Carabidae
- Genus: Caelostomus
- Species: C. crenulipennis

Binomial name
- Caelostomus crenulipennis Straneo, 1938

Species of beetle

Caelostomus crenulipennis is a species of ground beetle in the subfamily Pterostichinae. It was described by Straneo in 1938.

This species is found in Thailand.
