= Caelostomus substriatus =

Scientific classification
- Kingdom: Animalia
- Phylum: Arthropoda
- Class: Insecta
- Order: Coleoptera
- Suborder: Adephaga
- Family: Carabidae
- Subfamily: Pterostichinae
- Genus: Caelostomus
- Species: C. substriatus

Binomial name
- Caelostomus substriatus Straneo, 1940

Species of beetle

Caelostomus substriatus is a species in the ground beetle family Carabidae. It is found in Madagascar.
