= Caelostomus longissimus =

Scientific classification
- Kingdom: Animalia
- Phylum: Arthropoda
- Class: Insecta
- Order: Coleoptera
- Suborder: Adephaga
- Superfamily: Caraboidea
- Family: Carabidae
- Subfamily: Pterostichinae
- Genus: Caelostomus
- Species: C. longissimus

Binomial name
- Caelostomus longissimus Straneo, 1951

Species of beetle

Caelostomus longissimus is a species in the ground beetle family Carabidae. It is found in Vietnam.
