= Caelostomus abruptus =

Scientific classification
- Domain: Eukaryota
- Kingdom: Animalia
- Phylum: Arthropoda
- Class: Insecta
- Order: Coleoptera
- Suborder: Adephaga
- Family: Carabidae
- Genus: Caelostomus
- Species: C. abruptus

Binomial name
- Caelostomus abruptus Jordan, 1894

Species of beetle

Caelostomus abruptus is a species of ground beetle in the subfamily Pterostichinae. It was described by Karl Jordan in 1894.

This species is found in Indonesia.
