= Elzéar Abeille de Perrin =

French entomologist and lawyer (1843–1910)

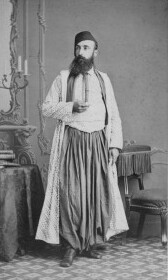
Elzéar Emmanuel Arène Abeille de Perrin in Algerian costume

Elzéar Emmanuel Arène Abeille de Perrin (French pronunciation: [ɛlzeaʁ emanɥɛl aʁɛn abɛj də pɛʁɛ̃]; 3 January 1843, Marseille – 9 October 1910, Marseille) was a French entomologist.

Abeille de Perrin was a lawyer in Marseille. He gave all his free time to entomology and was a member of the Société entomologique de France for twenty years. He was especially interested in the cave species of the Pyrenees. His best known publications are Monographie des malachites (1869), Études sur les coléoptères cavernicoles, suivies de la description de 27 coléoptères nouveaux français (1872), Notes sur les leptodirites (1878), and Synopsis critique et synonymique des chrysides de France (1878).

His collection of Palearctic, Coleoptera, Hymenoptera, Diptera, and Orthoptera is conserved in Muséum national d'histoire naturelle in Paris.
