= René Jeannel =

French entomologist (1879–1965)

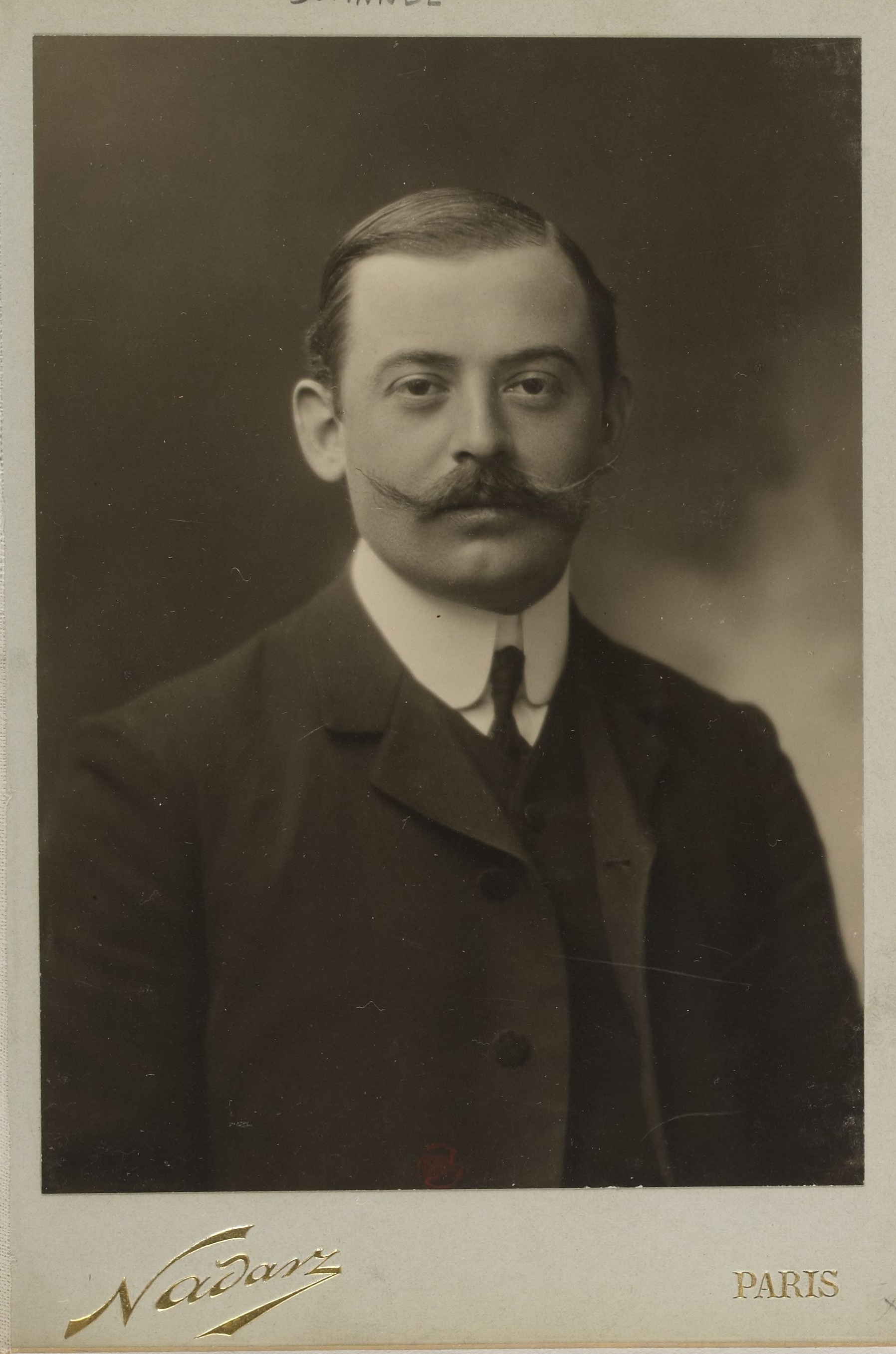
- René Jeannel, c. 1905
- Born: 23 March 1879; Paris, France
- Died: 20 February 1965 (aged 85); Paris, France
- Education: Science Faculty of Paris (1911); Faculté de médecine de Paris (1907); University of Toulouse
- Known for: French entomologist
- Father: Maurice Jeannel

René Jeannel (23 March 1879 – 20 February 1965) was a French entomologist. He was director of the Muséum national d'histoire naturelle from 1945 to 1951. Jeannel's most important work was on the insect fauna of caves in the Pyrenees, France and in the Carpathians, Romania. He also worked in Africa. Jeannel specialised in Leiodidae (then Silphidae or Catopidae) but authored a large number of papers and works on other Coleoptera. He was a member of the Romanian Academy.

As the son of a medical officer in the French military, Jeannel was expected to succeed his father. However, after developing an interest, during his studies in Toulouse, in cave exploration and especially cave fauna, he began considering a career in biological science instead. His interest was especially stimulated when he discovered two new cave beetles in the Grotte d’Oxibar (named after him by Abeille de Perrin: Bathyscia jeanneli and Aphaenops jeanneli.

In 1905 he began a life-long friendship and collaboration with Romanian biologist Emile Racovitza. In the first 17 years alone they jointly explored 1,400 caves in southern Europe and North Africa and published descriptions of the caves and their fauna. When Racovitza was invited to found a biospeleological institute in Cluj, Jeannel became his deputy director until 1927, when Jeannel obtained a chair in entomology in the Paris museum.

Despite his administrative positions, Jeannel remained a productive scientist. In 1911, when he published his 641-page, 657-illustration doctoral thesis on Leptodirini (then called Bathysciinae), he had already produced more than 30 papers. During the rest of his career, he added another 500 scientific publications to this total, together amounting to more than 20,000 published pages—mostly on cave insects and all illustrated by himself.

Jeannel's most important contribution to taxonomy was that he realised the potential of using the genitalia for species identification and classification. Genitalia evolve faster than external parts of the body and therefore the differences between species are greater. In his book l'Édéage (1955), he summarized all the insights the study of the aedeagus (the term used for the male beetle genital apparatus) had afforded him.

== Works ==
- Revision des Bathysciinae (Coleoptères silphides): morphologie, distribution géographique, systématique Paris, Libraire A. Schulz (1911).
- Faune cavernicole de la France "The Fauna of the Caves of France") (1940).
- La genèse des faunes terrestres "The Origins of Terrestrial Fauna") (1942).
- Voyage de Ch. Alluaud et R. Jeannel en Afrique Orientale (1911–1912). Résultats scientifiques, 1–6. (1913–1919).
- "Monographie des Catopidae". Mémoires du Muséum National d’Histoire Naturelle (N.S.), 1: 1-435. (1936)
- "L’isolement, facteur de l’évolution" Revue Française d’Entomologie, 8: 101-110. (1942)
- "L’Édéage; initiation aux recherches sur la systématique des Coléoptères" Publications du Muséum National d’Histoire Naturelle, Paris, 16: 1-155. (1955)
