= Stefano Ludovico Straneo =

Italian entomologist (1902–1997)

- Born: 6 June 1902; Turin, Italy
- Died: 9 December 1997 (aged 95); Milan, Italy
- Known for: Taxonomy of Carabidae
- Scientific career
- Fields: Entomology

Stefano Ludovico Straneo (also Lodovico) (Turin, 6 June 1902 – Milan, 9 December 1997) was an Italian entomologist, teacher, academic administrator and author.

Straneo's primary fields of interest were the beetles (Coleoptera), in particular the family of ground beetles (Carabidae, tribe Pterostichinae). He described 64 new genera and almost 1,200 new species. His collection, Coleoptera: Carabidae and Paussidae, is on display at the Museo Civico di Storia Naturale di Milano.

Straneo's father was a theoretical physicist and an acquaintance of Albert Einstein. He showed an early interest in biology and began collecting insects, eventually focusing on carabid beetles. He published his first paper in 1933 and 238 more until 1995. He received the Italian Golden Medal for Distinguished Educator in Culture And Art in 1972.

== Works ==
- 1984 - Two new species or Pterostichini (Coleoptera, Carabidae) in the collections of the Museum of Natural History of the Humboldt University of Berlin.
- 1984 - Un nuovo genere del Camerun della tribù Pterostichini (Coleoptera Carabidae).
- 1983 - Nuovi pterostichini asiatici (Coleoptera, Carabidae).
- 1984 - Un nuovo Pterostichus dell'Anatolia occidentale (Col., Carabidae).
- 1984 - Sul genere Amolopsa Beach (Coleoptera Carabidae).
