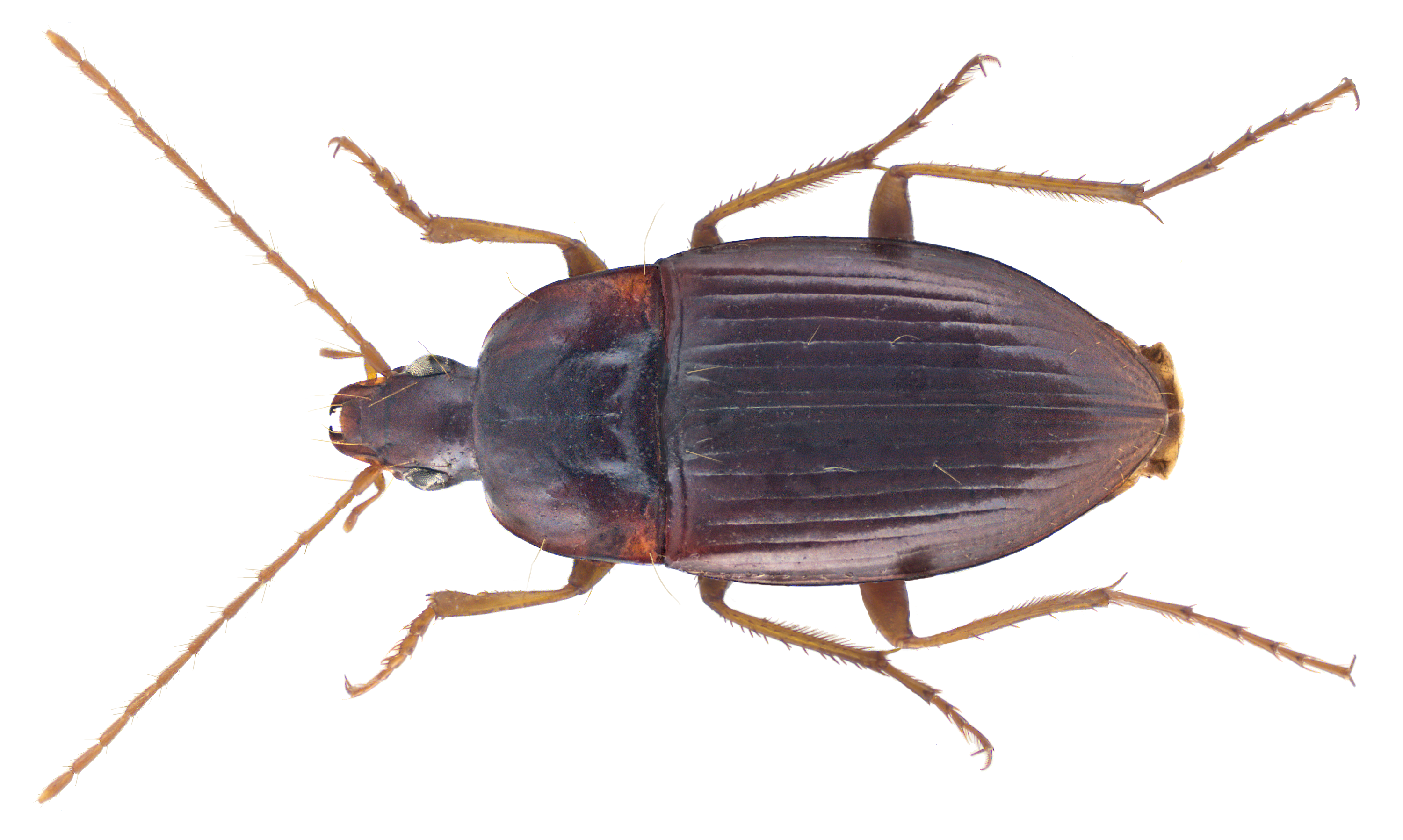

Scientific classification
- Kingdom: Animalia
- Phylum: Arthropoda
- Class: Insecta
- Order: Coleoptera
- Suborder: Adephaga
- Family: Carabidae
- Genus: Calathus
- Species: C. abaxoides

Binomial name
- Calathus abaxoides Brullé, 1839

Synonyms
- Calathus abacoides Wollaston, 1864

= Calathus abaxoides =

Species of beetle

Calathus abaxoides is a species of ground beetle from the Platyninae from the Platyninae subfamily. It is endemic to Tenerife, the Canary Islands. It occurs in laurel forests, often on tree trunks .
