= Calathus asturiensis =

Scientific classification
- Kingdom: Animalia
- Phylum: Arthropoda
- Class: Insecta
- Order: Coleoptera
- Suborder: Adephaga
- Family: Carabidae
- Genus: Calathus
- Species: C. asturiensis

Binomial name
- Calathus asturiensis Vuillefroy, 1866

Synonyms
- Calathus bipunctatus Gautier des Cottes, 1867

Species of beetle

Calathus asturiensis is a species of ground beetle from the Platyninae subfamily that can be found in France and Spain.
