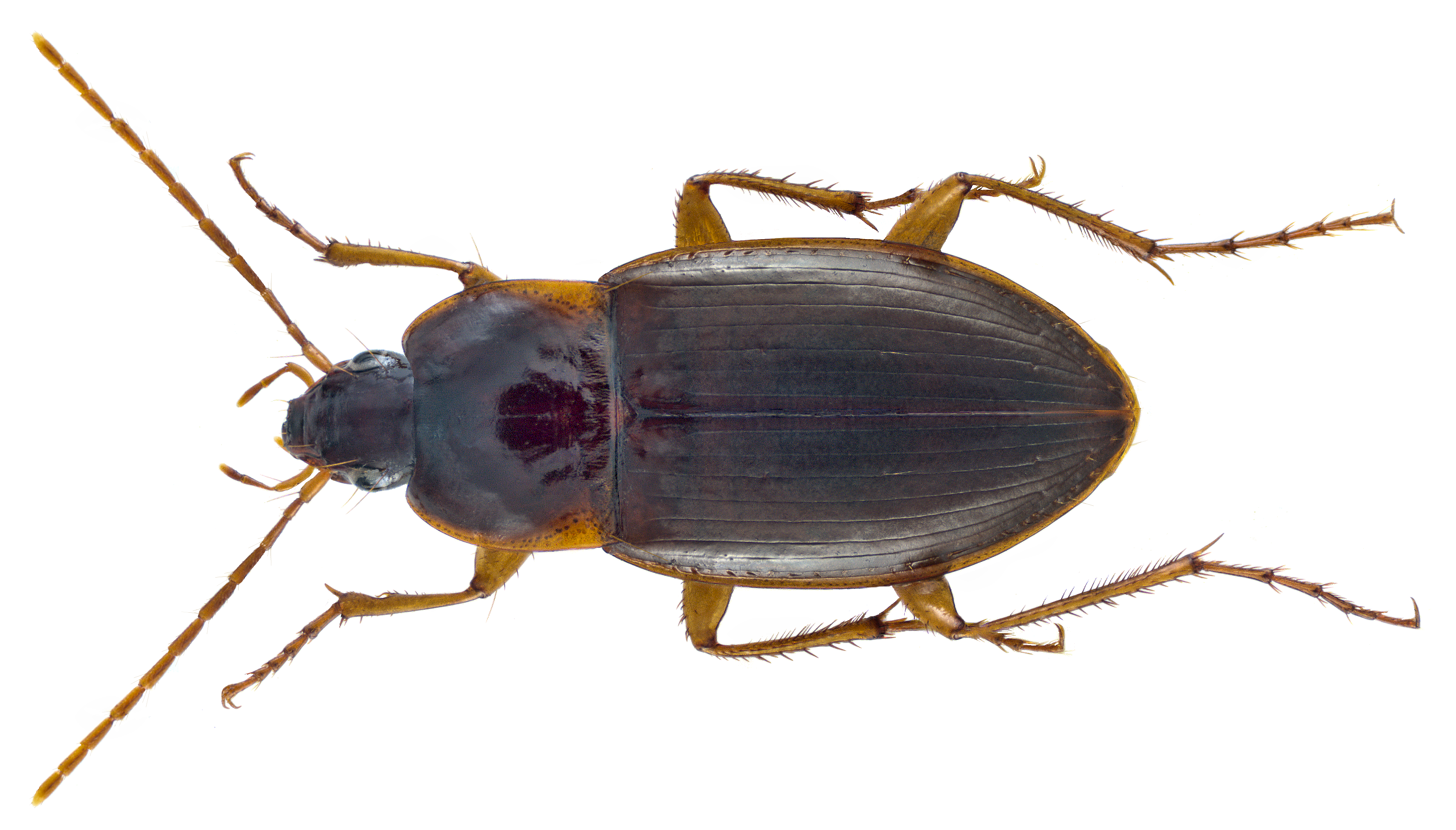

Scientific classification
- Kingdom: Animalia
- Phylum: Arthropoda
- Class: Insecta
- Order: Coleoptera
- Suborder: Adephaga
- Family: Carabidae
- Genus: Calathus
- Species: C. angularis

Binomial name
- Calathus angularis Brullé, 1839

Synonyms
- Calathus barbatus Wollaston, 1862

= Calathus angularis =

Species of beetle

Calathus angularis is a species of ground beetle from the Platyninae subfamily that is endemic to the Canary Islands.
