= Calathus ciliatus =

Scientific classification
- Kingdom: Animalia
- Phylum: Arthropoda
- Class: Insecta
- Order: Coleoptera
- Suborder: Adephaga
- Family: Carabidae
- Genus: Calathus
- Species: C. ciliatus

Binomial name
- Calathus ciliatus Wollaston, 1862

Species of beetle

Calathus ciliatus is a species of ground beetle from the Platyninae subfamily that is endemic to the Canary Islands.
