= Calathus depressus =

Scientific classification
- Kingdom: Animalia
- Phylum: Arthropoda
- Class: Insecta
- Order: Coleoptera
- Suborder: Adephaga
- Family: Carabidae
- Genus: Calathus
- Species: C. depressus

Binomial name
- Calathus depressus Brullé, 1836

Species of beetle

Calathus depressus is a species of ground beetle from the Platyninae subfamily. It is endemic to Tenerife, the Canary Islands. It occurs in the higher fayal/brezal forest and up into the mixed monteverde/pine forests.
