= Calathus uniseriatus =

Scientific classification
- Kingdom: Animalia
- Phylum: Arthropoda
- Class: Insecta
- Order: Coleoptera
- Suborder: Adephaga
- Family: Carabidae
- Genus: Calathus
- Species: C. uniseriatus

Binomial name
- Calathus uniseriatus Vuillefroy, 1866

Synonyms
- Calathus angularis Chevrolat, 1866; Calathus liotrachelus Vuillefroy, 1866

Species of beetle

Calathus uniseriatus is a species of ground beetle from the Platyninae subfamily that is endemic to Spain.
