= Camptodontus =

Camptodontus may refer to:

- Camptodontus (beetle), a genus of beetles in the family Carabidae
- an extinct genus of enantiornithine bird renamed Camptodontornis
