= Calathus rectus =

Scientific classification
- Kingdom: Animalia
- Phylum: Arthropoda
- Class: Insecta
- Order: Coleoptera
- Suborder: Adephaga
- Family: Carabidae
- Genus: Calathus
- Species: C. rectus

Binomial name
- Calathus rectus Wollaston, 1862

Synonyms
- Calathus fulvipes Brullé, 1839

Species of beetle

Calathus rectus is a species of ground beetle from the Platyninae from the Platyninae subfamily. It is endemic to Tenerife, the Canary Islands. It has a relatively wide distribution within the island and occurs in low- to mid-altitude monteverde forest, mixed monteverde/thermophilous forest, and in open areas.
