= Calathus obliteratus =

Scientific classification
- Kingdom: Animalia
- Phylum: Arthropoda
- Class: Insecta
- Order: Coleoptera
- Suborder: Adephaga
- Family: Carabidae
- Genus: Calathus
- Species: C. obliteratus

Binomial name
- Calathus obliteratus Wollaston, 1865

Synonyms
- Calathus apicerugosus Har. Lindberg, 1953

Species of beetle

Calathus obliteratus is a species of ground beetle from the Platyninae subfamily that is endemic to the Canary Islands.
