= Calathus carinatus =

Scientific classification
- Kingdom: Animalia
- Phylum: Arthropoda
- Class: Insecta
- Order: Coleoptera
- Suborder: Adephaga
- Family: Carabidae
- Genus: Calathus
- Species: C. carinatus

Binomial name
- Calathus carinatus Brullé, 1839

Synonyms
- Calathus abacoides Wollaston, 1864

Species of beetle

Calathus carinatus is a species of ground beetle from the Platyninae subfamily. It is endemic to Tenerife, the Canary Islands. It occurs in laurel forests, but is comparatively uncommon, typically found near springs and wet cracks of rocks.
