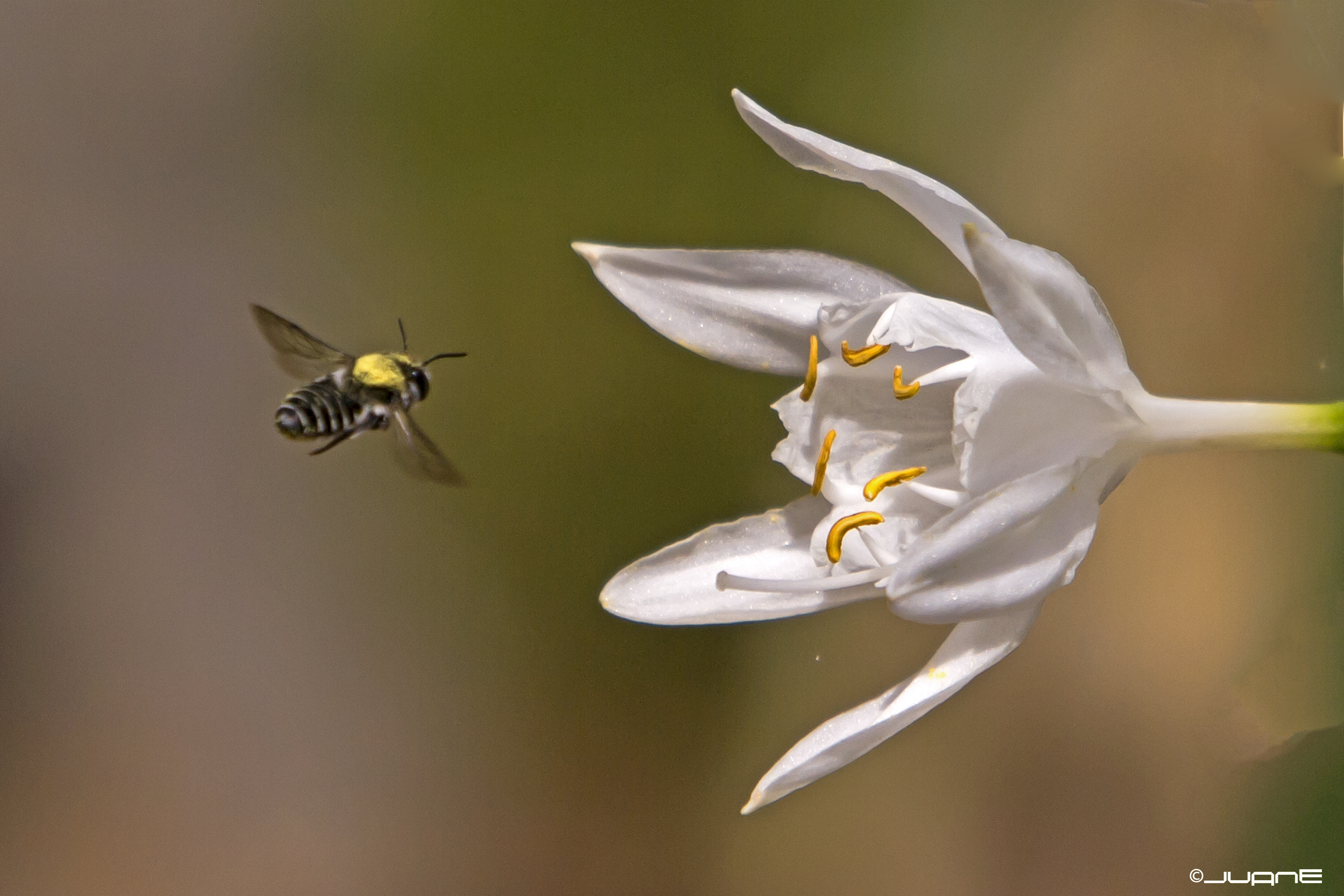

Scientific classification
- Domain: Eukaryota
- Kingdom: Animalia
- Phylum: Arthropoda
- Class: Insecta
- Order: Hymenoptera
- Family: Megachilidae
- Genus: Megachile
- Species: M. albohirta

Binomial name
- Megachile albohirta (Brullé, 1839)

= Megachile albohirta =

Species of leafcutter bee (Megachile)

Megachile albohirta is a species of bee in the family Megachilidae. It was described by Brullé in 1839.
