= Trechus custos =

Scientific classification
- Domain: Eukaryota
- Kingdom: Animalia
- Phylum: Arthropoda
- Class: Insecta
- Order: Coleoptera
- Suborder: Adephaga
- Family: Carabidae
- Genus: Trechus
- Species: T. custos

Binomial name
- Trechus custos Wollaston, 1854

Species of beetle

Trechus custos is a species of ground beetle in the subfamily Trechinae. It was described by Thomas Vernon Wollaston in 1854.
