= Harpalus schaumii =

Scientific classification
- Kingdom: Animalia
- Phylum: Arthropoda
- Class: Insecta
- Order: Coleoptera
- Suborder: Adephaga
- Family: Carabidae
- Genus: Harpalus
- Species: H. schaumii

Binomial name
- Harpalus schaumii Wollaston, 1864

Species of beetle

Harpalus schaumii is a species of ground beetle in the subfamily Harpalinae. It was described by Thomas Vernon Wollaston in 1864.
