= Calathus angustulus =

Scientific classification
- Kingdom: Animalia
- Phylum: Arthropoda
- Class: Insecta
- Order: Coleoptera
- Suborder: Adephaga
- Family: Carabidae
- Genus: Calathus
- Species: C. angustulus

Binomial name
- Calathus angustulus Wollaston, 1862

Species of beetle

Calathus angustulus is a species of ground beetle from the Platyninae from the Platyninae subfamily. It is endemic to Tenerife, the Canary Islands. It occurs in laurel forests.
