= Trechus flavomarginatus =

Scientific classification
- Kingdom: Animalia
- Phylum: Arthropoda
- Clade: Pancrustacea
- Class: Insecta
- Order: Coleoptera
- Suborder: Adephaga
- Family: Carabidae
- Genus: Trechus
- Species: T. flavomarginatus

Binomial name
- Trechus flavomarginatus Wollaston, 1854

Species of beetle

Trechus flavomarginatus is a species of ground beetle in the subfamily Trechinae. It was described by Thomas Vernon Wollaston in 1854. He found it in various locations in the Madeira archipelago.

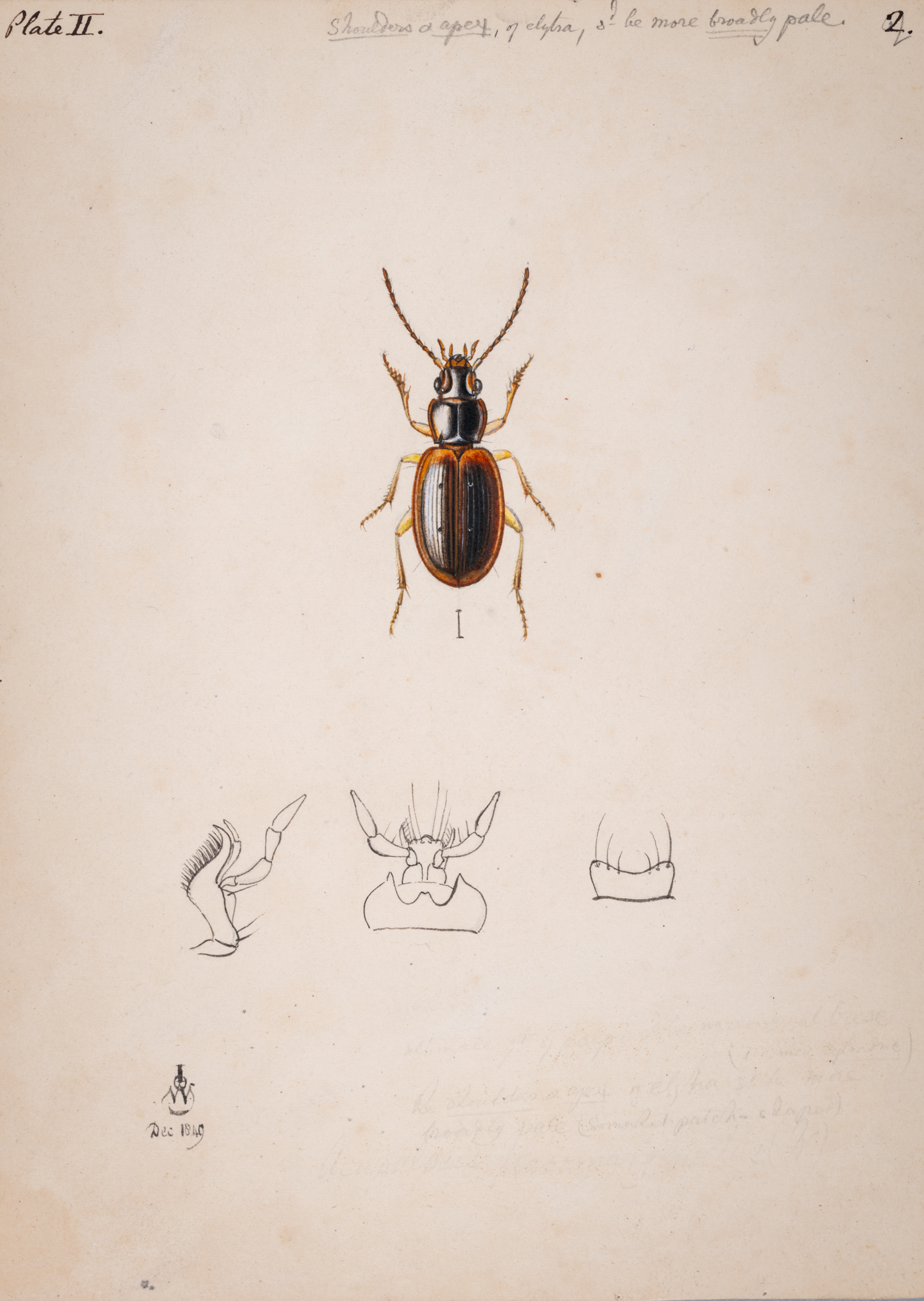
Trechus Flavomarginatus - John Obadiah Westwood - 488 1911
