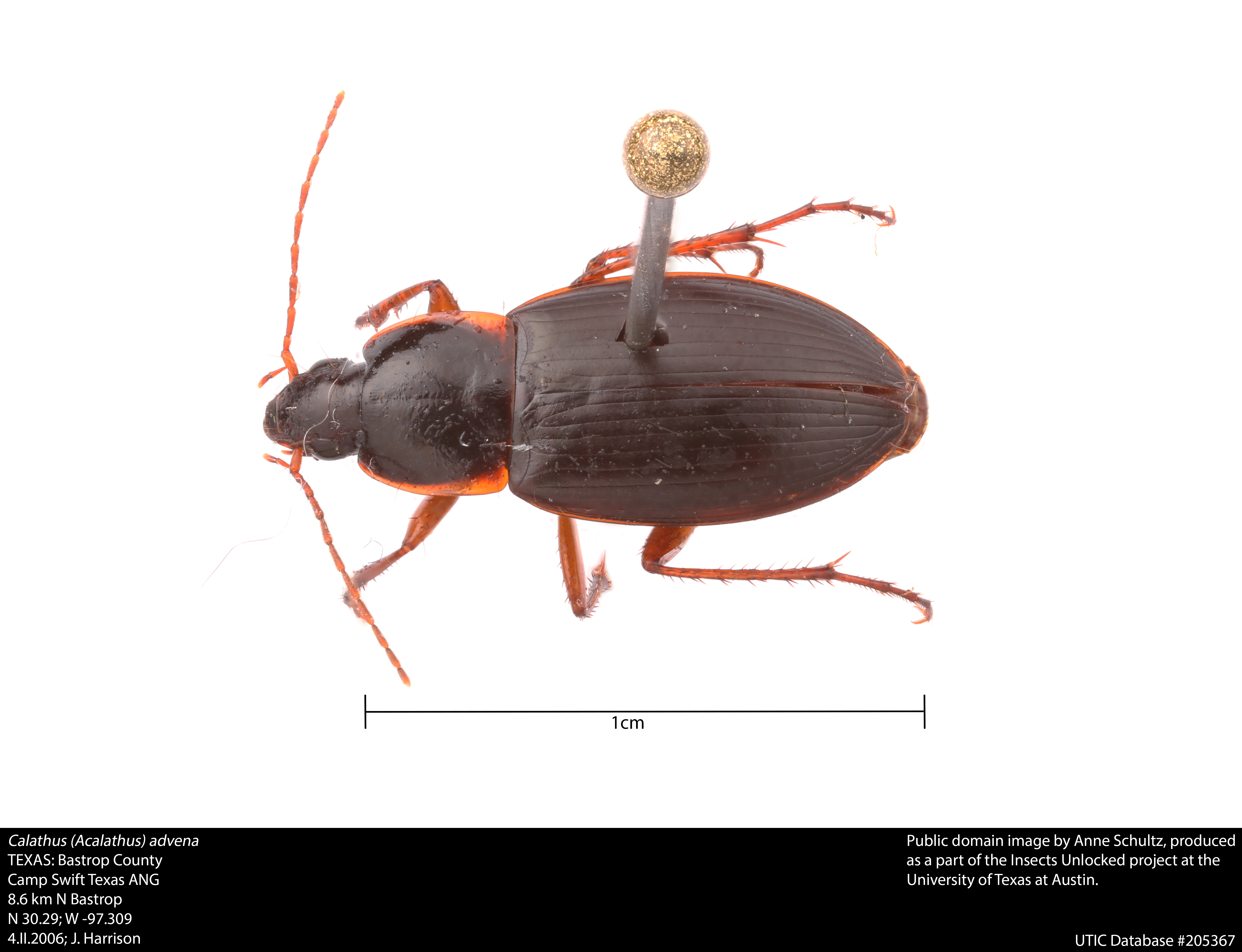

Scientific classification
- Kingdom: Animalia
- Phylum: Arthropoda
- Class: Insecta
- Order: Coleoptera
- Suborder: Adephaga
- Family: Carabidae
- Genus: Calathus
- Species: C. advena

Binomial name
- Calathus advena (LeConte, 1846)

Synonyms
- Calathus scolopax (Casey, 1920)

= Calathus advena =

Species of beetle

Calathus advena is a species of ground beetle in the family Carabidae, found in North America. It is sometimes considered a species of the genus Acalathus.
