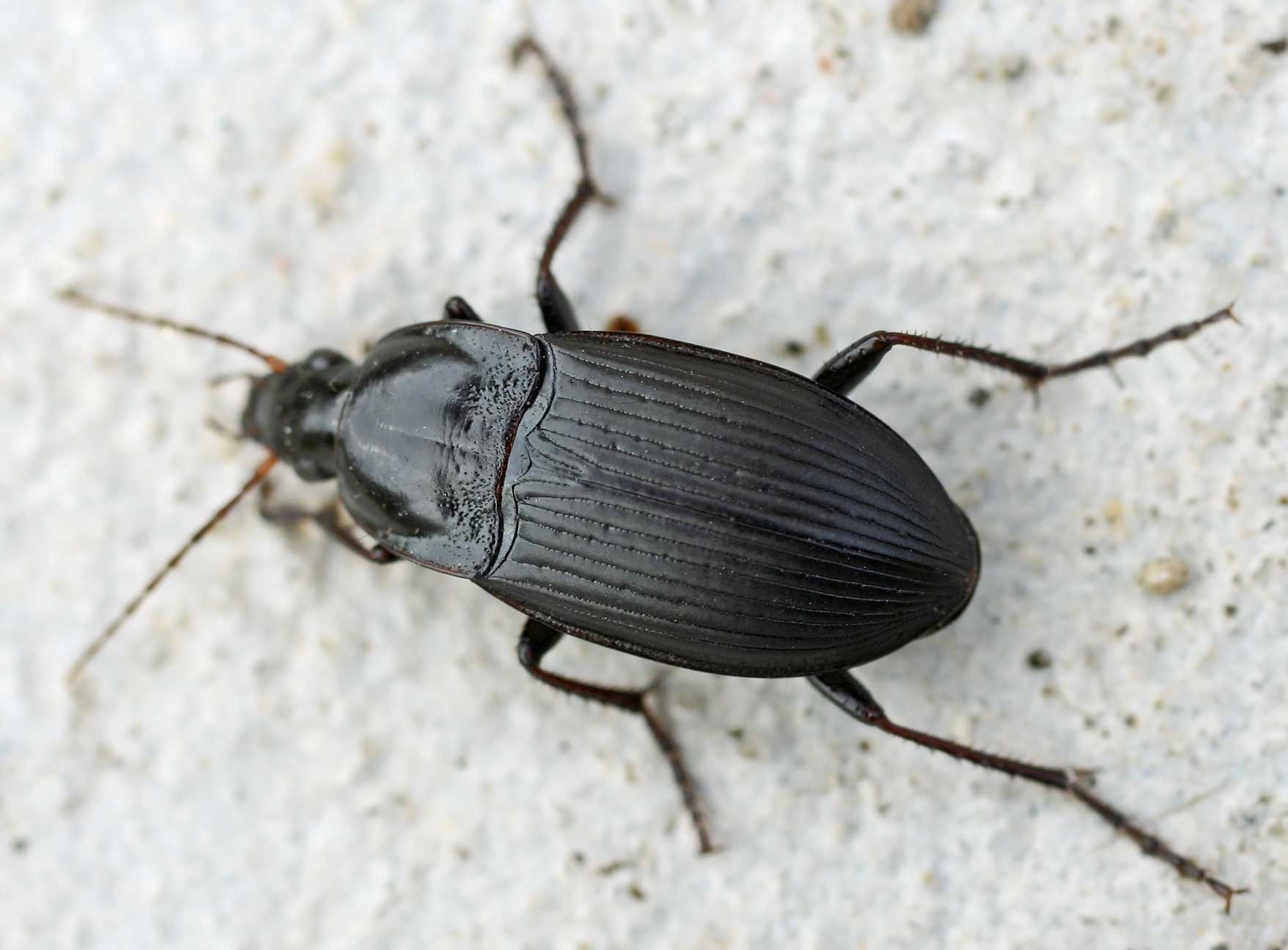

Scientific classification
- Kingdom: Animalia
- Phylum: Arthropoda
- Class: Insecta
- Order: Coleoptera
- Suborder: Adephaga
- Family: Carabidae
- Genus: Calathus
- Species: C. luctuosus

Binomial name
- Calathus luctuosus (Latreille, 1804)

Synonyms
- Calathus colasi Puel, 1938; Calathus gallicus Fairmaire & Laboulbene, 1854; Calathus pyrenaeus Schatzmayr, 1937

= Calathus luctuosus =

Species of beetle

Calathus luctuosus is a species of ground beetle from the Platyninae subfamily that can be found in Andorra, France, Portugal and Spain.
