= Calathus focarilei =

Scientific classification
- Kingdom: Animalia
- Phylum: Arthropoda
- Clade: Pancrustacea
- Class: Insecta
- Order: Coleoptera
- Suborder: Adephaga
- Family: Carabidae
- Genus: Calathus
- Species: C. focarilei

Binomial name
- Calathus focarilei Schatzmayr, 1947

Species of beetle

Calathus focarilei is a species of ground beetle from the Platyninae subfamily that is endemic to Italy.
