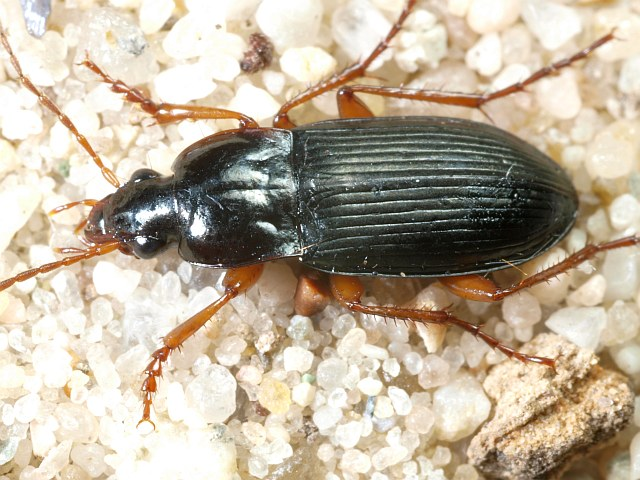
- Calathus erratus, location: The Netherlands - Loonse en Drunense Duinen - Zandverstuiving

Scientific classification
- Kingdom: Animalia
- Phylum: Arthropoda
- Class: Insecta
- Order: Coleoptera
- Suborder: Adephaga
- Family: Carabidae
- Genus: Calathus
- Species: C. erratus

Binomial name
- Calathus erratus (C.R. Sahlberg, 1827)

Synonyms
- Harpalus erratus C.R. Sahlberg, 1827; Harpalus fulvipes Gyllenhal, 1810

= Calathus erratus =

Species of beetle

Calathus erratus is a species of ground beetle from the Platyninae subfamily that can be found everywhere in Europe except for Andorra, Belarus, Monaco, San Marino, Vatican City and various islands.
