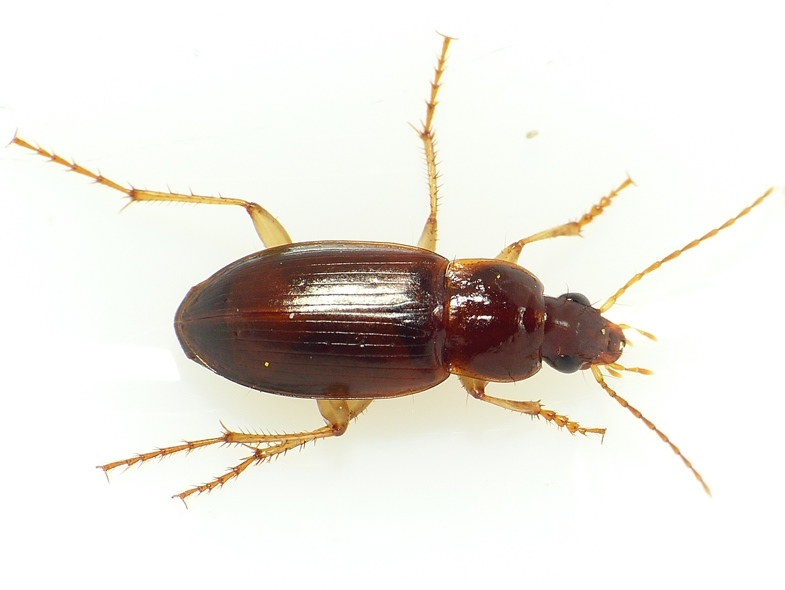

Scientific classification
- Kingdom: Animalia
- Phylum: Arthropoda
- Class: Insecta
- Order: Coleoptera
- Suborder: Adephaga
- Family: Carabidae
- Genus: Calathus
- Species: C. mollis

Binomial name
- Calathus mollis (Marsham, 1802)

Synonyms
- Calathus armoricus Porta, 1923; Calathus atticus Gautier des Cottes, 1867; Calathus encaustes Fairmaire, 1868; Calathus maritimus Schilsky, 1894

= Calathus mollis =

Species of beetle

Calathus mollis is a species of ground beetle from the Platyninae subfamily that can be found everywhere in Europe except for Albania, Andorra, Finland, Hungary, Italy, Luxembourg, Moldova, Monaco, Russia, San Marino, Slovakia, Switzerland, Vatican City, and various islands.
