= Calathus glabricollis =

Scientific classification
- Kingdom: Animalia
- Phylum: Arthropoda
- Class: Insecta
- Order: Coleoptera
- Suborder: Adephaga
- Family: Carabidae
- Genus: Calathus
- Species: C. glabricollis

Binomial name
- Calathus glabricollis Dejean, 1828

Synonyms
- Calathus zeelandicus L. Redtenbacher, 1867

Species of beetle

Calathus glabricollis is a species of ground beetle from the Platyninae subfamily that can be found in Bulgaria, Greece, Italy and all states of former Yugoslavia.
