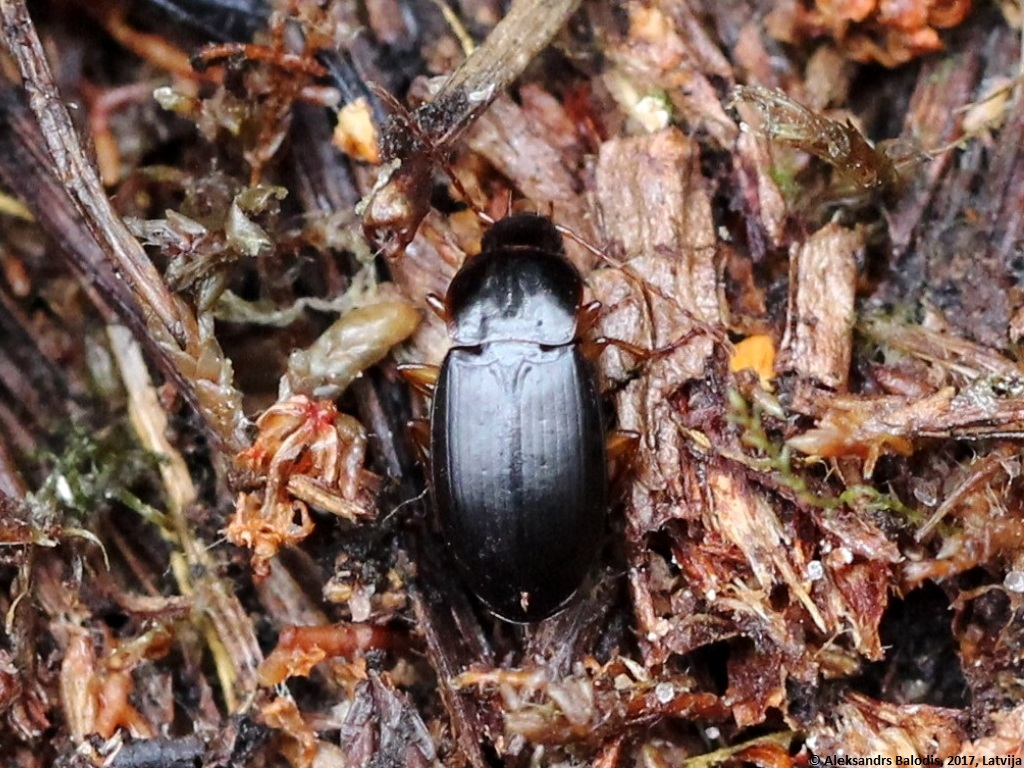

Scientific classification
- Kingdom: Animalia
- Phylum: Arthropoda
- Class: Insecta
- Order: Coleoptera
- Suborder: Adephaga
- Family: Carabidae
- Genus: Calathus
- Species: C. micropterus

Binomial name
- Calathus micropterus (Duftschmid, 1812)

Synonyms
- Calathus borealis Motschulsky, 1850; Calathus microcephalus Dejean, 1828

= Calathus micropterus =

Species of beetle

Calathus micropterus is a species of ground beetle from the Platyninae subfamily that can be found everywhere in Europe except for Albania, Andorra, Greece, Hungary, Moldova, Monaco, Portugal, San Marino, Spain, Vatican City, all states of former Yugoslavia (except Croatia and Bosnia and Herzegovina), and various islands.
