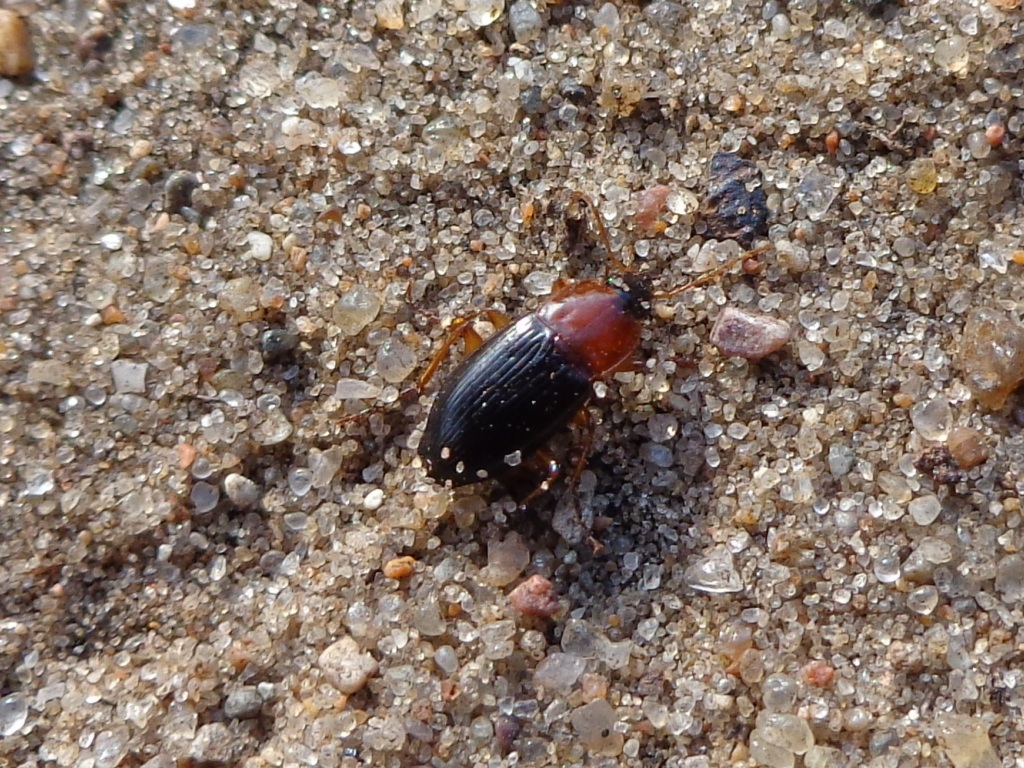

Scientific classification
- Kingdom: Animalia
- Phylum: Arthropoda
- Class: Insecta
- Order: Coleoptera
- Suborder: Adephaga
- Family: Carabidae
- Genus: Calathus
- Species: C. melanocephalus

Binomial name
- Calathus melanocephalus (Linnaeus, 1758)

= Calathus melanocephalus =

Species of beetle

Calathus melanocephalus is a species of blackish-red coloured ground beetle from the Platyninae subfamily that can be found everywhere in Europe except for Monaco, San Marino, Vatican City and various European, Asian and African islands. The species is mostly black coloured and have red thorax. It is found in bare, sandy soil, under stones, and in leaf litter. Its flying time is from April to September.

== Distribution ==
It is found widely across the United Kingdom.
