= Calathus metallicus =

Scientific classification
- Kingdom: Animalia
- Phylum: Arthropoda
- Class: Insecta
- Order: Coleoptera
- Suborder: Adephaga
- Family: Carabidae
- Genus: Calathus
- Species: C. metallicus

Binomial name
- Calathus metallicus (Dejean, 1828

Synonyms
- Calathus aeneus Putzeys, 1873; Calathus biharicus Maran, 1934; Calathus deplanatus Chaudoir, 1843; Calathus prokletijensis Maran, 1938

Species of beetle

Calathus metallicus is a species of ground beetle from the Platyninae subfamily that can be found in Albania, Bulgaria, Greece, Poland, Romania, Slovakia, Ukraine, all states of former Yugoslavia (except Slovenia), and Near East.
