= Calathus reflexus =

Scientific classification
- Kingdom: Animalia
- Phylum: Arthropoda
- Class: Insecta
- Order: Coleoptera
- Suborder: Adephaga
- Family: Carabidae
- Genus: Calathus
- Species: C. reflexus

Binomial name
- Calathus reflexus Schaum, 1858

Species of beetle

Calathus reflexus is a species of ground beetle from the Platyninae subfamily that can be found on Cyprus and in the Near East.
