= Calathus vicenteorum =

Conservation status
- Extinct (1957) (IUCN 3.1)

Scientific classification
- Kingdom: Animalia
- Phylum: Arthropoda
- Class: Insecta
- Order: Coleoptera
- Suborder: Adephaga
- Family: Carabidae
- Genus: Calathus
- Species: †C. vicenteorum

Binomial name
- †Calathus vicenteorum Schatzmayr, 1937

Species of beetle

Calathus vicenteorum is a species of ground beetle from the Platyninae subfamily that is endemic to the Azores.
