= Calathus minutus =

Scientific classification
- Kingdom: Animalia
- Phylum: Arthropoda
- Class: Insecta
- Order: Coleoptera
- Suborder: Adephaga
- Family: Carabidae
- Genus: Calathus
- Species: C. minutus

Binomial name
- Calathus minutus Gautier des Cottes, 1866

Synonyms
- Calathus machadoi Jeanne, 1970; Calathus sublaevis Vuillefroy, 1866

Species of beetle

Calathus minutus is a species of ground beetle from the Platyninae subfamily that can be found in Portugal and Spain.
