= Calathus circumseptus =

Scientific classification
- Kingdom: Animalia
- Phylum: Arthropoda
- Class: Insecta
- Order: Coleoptera
- Suborder: Adephaga
- Family: Carabidae
- Genus: Calathus
- Species: C. circumseptus

Binomial name
- Calathus circumseptus Germar, 1824

Synonyms
- Calathus flavocircumdatus Uyttenboogaart, 1937; Calathus lateralis Kuster, 1847; Calathus limbatus Dejean, 1828; Calathus marginellus Sturm, 1826

Species of beetle

Calathus circumseptus is a species of ground beetle from the Platyninae subfamily that lives in Albania, France, Greece, Italy, Portugal and Spain.
