= Calathus jakupicensis =

Scientific classification
- Kingdom: Animalia
- Phylum: Arthropoda
- Class: Insecta
- Order: Coleoptera
- Suborder: Adephaga
- Family: Carabidae
- Genus: Calathus
- Species: C. jakupicensis

Binomial name
- Calathus jakupicensis B.V. Gueorguiev, 2008

Species of beetle

Calathus jakupicensis is a species of ground beetle from the Platyninae subfamily that is endemic to North Macedonia. It was described by Borislav V. Guéorguiev who discovered it on Karadzica mountain in North Macedonia in 2008. It was named after the massif it was discovered on. It occurs in the subalpine zone.

== Description ==
Calathus jakupicensis is a wingless species measuring 11.4 mm (0.45 in) in body length.
