= Calathus mirei =

Scientific classification
- Kingdom: Animalia
- Phylum: Arthropoda
- Clade: Pancrustacea
- Class: Insecta
- Order: Coleoptera
- Suborder: Adephaga
- Family: Carabidae
- Genus: Calathus
- Species: C. mirei

Binomial name
- Calathus mirei Nègre, 1966

Species of beetle

Calathus mirei is a species of ground beetle in the Platyninae subfamily that is endemic to Spain.
