= Calathus hispanicus =

Scientific classification
- Kingdom: Animalia
- Phylum: Arthropoda
- Class: Insecta
- Order: Coleoptera
- Suborder: Adephaga
- Family: Carabidae
- Genus: Calathus
- Species: C. hispanicus

Binomial name
- Calathus hispanicus Gautier des Cottes, 1866

Synonyms
- Calathus lugens Vuillefroy, 1866; Calathus uhagoni Gautier des Cottes, 1870

Species of beetle

Calathus hispanicus is a species of ground beetle from the Platyninae subfamily that can be found in Portugal and Spain.
