= Brachytemnus =

Scientific classification
- Domain: Eukaryota
- Kingdom: Animalia
- Phylum: Arthropoda
- Class: Insecta
- Order: Coleoptera
- Suborder: Polyphaga
- Infraorder: Cucujiformia
- Family: Curculionidae
- Genus: Brachytemnus; Wollaston, 1873

Genus of beetles

Brachytemnus is a genus of beetles belonging to the family Curculionidae.

Species:

- Brachytemnus pinipotens (Wollaston, 1867)
- Brachytemnus ruptus Marshall, 1928
