= Nebria vuillefroyi =

Scientific classification
- Kingdom: Animalia
- Phylum: Arthropoda
- Class: Insecta
- Order: Coleoptera
- Suborder: Adephaga
- Family: Carabidae
- Subfamily: Nebriinae
- Tribe: Nebriini
- Genus: Nebria
- Species: N. vuillefroyi

Binomial name
- Nebria vuillefroyi Chaudoir, 1866

Species of beetle

Nebria vuillefroyi is a species in the beetle family Carabidae. It is endemic to Spain. The species is named after the French artist and insect collector Félix de Vuillefroy-Cassini.
