= Calathus solieri =

Scientific classification
- Kingdom: Animalia
- Phylum: Arthropoda
- Class: Insecta
- Order: Coleoptera
- Suborder: Adephaga
- Family: Carabidae
- Genus: Calathus
- Species: C. solieri

Binomial name
- Calathus solieri Bassi, 1834

Species of beetle

Calathus solieri is a species of ground beetle from the Platyninae subfamily that can be found on the islands such as Sardinia and Sicily.
