= Calathus carvalhoi =

Conservation status
- Critically Endangered (IUCN 3.1)

Scientific classification
- Kingdom: Animalia
- Phylum: Arthropoda
- Class: Insecta
- Order: Coleoptera
- Suborder: Adephaga
- Family: Carabidae
- Genus: Calathus
- Species: C. carvalhoi

Binomial name
- Calathus carvalhoi Serrano & Borges, 1986

Species of beetle

Calathus carvalhoi is a species of ground beetle from the Platyninae subfamily that is endemic to the Azores.
