= Calathus longicollis =

Scientific classification
- Kingdom: Animalia
- Phylum: Arthropoda
- Class: Insecta
- Order: Coleoptera
- Suborder: Adephaga
- Family: Carabidae
- Genus: Calathus
- Species: C. longicollis

Binomial name
- Calathus longicollis Motschulsky, 1865

Species of beetle

Calathus longicollis is a species of ground beetle from the Platyninae subfamily that can be found in Bulgaria, Greece, Russia, Armenia, Cyprus, Georgia, Israel, Lebanon and Turkey.
