= Calathus gonzalezi =

Scientific classification
- Kingdom: Animalia
- Phylum: Arthropoda
- Class: Insecta
- Order: Coleoptera
- Suborder: Adephaga
- Family: Carabidae
- Genus: Calathus
- Species: C. gonzalezi

Binomial name
- Calathus gonzalezi Mateu, 1956

Synonyms
- Calathus barbatus Wollaston, 1862

Species of beetle

Calathus gonzalezi is a species of ground beetle from the Platyninae subfamily. It is endemic to Lanzarote, the Canary Islands. It lives at the highest altitudes of the island in relatively humid climate.
