= Calathus pilosipennis =

Scientific classification
- Kingdom: Animalia
- Phylum: Arthropoda
- Class: Insecta
- Order: Coleoptera
- Suborder: Adephaga
- Family: Carabidae
- Genus: Calathus
- Species: C. pilosipennis

Binomial name
- Calathus pilosipennis Machado, 1992

Species of beetle

Calathus pilosipennis is a species of ground beetle from the Platyninae subfamily that is endemic to the Canary Islands.
