= Calathus pecoudi =

Scientific classification
- Kingdom: Animalia
- Phylum: Arthropoda
- Class: Insecta
- Order: Coleoptera
- Suborder: Adephaga
- Family: Carabidae
- Genus: Calathus
- Species: C. pecoudi

Binomial name
- Calathus pecoudi Colas, 1938

Species of beetle

Calathus pecoudi is a species of ground beetle from the Platyninae subfamily that is endemic to Madeira.
