= Scymnus brullei =

Scientific classification
- Kingdom: Animalia
- Phylum: Arthropoda
- Clade: Pancrustacea
- Class: Insecta
- Order: Coleoptera
- Suborder: Polyphaga
- Infraorder: Cucujiformia
- Family: Coccinellidae
- Genus: Scymnus
- Species: S. brullei

Binomial name
- Scymnus brullei Mulsant, 1850

Species of beetle

Scymnus brullei, the Brullé's lady beetle, is a species of dusky lady beetle in the family Coccinellidae. It is found in North America. The specific name brullei honours Gaspard Auguste Brullé.
