= Calathus colasianus =

Scientific classification
- Kingdom: Animalia
- Phylum: Arthropoda
- Class: Insecta
- Order: Coleoptera
- Suborder: Adephaga
- Family: Carabidae
- Genus: Calathus
- Species: C. colasianus

Binomial name
- Calathus colasianus Nègre, 1969

Species of beetle

Calathus colasianus is a species of ground beetle from the Platyninae subfamily that is endemic to Madeira.
