= Calathus canariensis =

Scientific classification
- Kingdom: Animalia
- Phylum: Arthropoda
- Class: Insecta
- Order: Coleoptera
- Suborder: Adephaga
- Family: Carabidae
- Genus: Calathus
- Species: C. canariensis

Binomial name
- Calathus canariensis Harold, 1868

Synonyms
- Calathus advena Wollaston, 1862; Calathus csikii Jedlicka, 1958

Species of beetle

Calathus auctus is a species of ground beetle from the Platyninae subfamily that is endemic to the Canary Islands.
