= Lindrothius =

Scientific classification
- Kingdom: Animalia
- Phylum: Arthropoda
- Clade: Pancrustacea
- Class: Insecta
- Order: Coleoptera
- Suborder: Adephaga
- Family: Carabidae
- Genus: Calathus
- Subgenus: Lindrothius; Kurnakov, 1961

Genus of beetles

Lindrothius is a subgenus in the ground beetle genus Calathus, family Carabidae. There are about 14 described species in this subgenus, found in Georgia, Russia, and Turkey.

This subgenus has been considered a genus in the past, and its species are sometimes called Lindrothius... instead of Calathus....

== Species ==
These 14 species belong to the subgenus Lindrothius of the genus Calathus.

- Calathus aeneocupreus (Heinz, 1971) (Turkey)
- Calathus aequistriatus (Kurnakov, 1961) (Georgia and Russia)
- Calathus caucasicus Chaudoir, 1846 (Georgia and Russia)
- Calathus grandiceps (Kurnakov, 1961) (Georgia and Russia)
- Calathus horsti (Reitter, 1888) (Russia)
- Calathus laticaudis (Kurnakov, 1961) (Russia)
- Calathus mandibularis (Kurnakov, 1961) (Georgia)
- Calathus praestans (Heyden, 1885) (Russia)
- Calathus pseudopraestans (Kurnakov, 1961) (Russia)
- Calathus recticaudis (Kurnakov, 1961) (Russia)
- Calathus robustus (Kurnakov, 1961) (Georgia and Russia)
- Calathus sotshiensis (Zamotajlov, 1997) (Russia)
- Calathus stricticaudis (Kurnakov, 1961) (Georgia)
- Calathus subpraestans (Kurnakov, 1961) (Georgia and Russia)
