= Calathus baeticus =

Scientific classification
- Kingdom: Animalia
- Phylum: Arthropoda
- Class: Insecta
- Order: Coleoptera
- Suborder: Adephaga
- Family: Carabidae
- Genus: Calathus
- Species: C. baeticus

Binomial name
- Calathus baeticus Rambur, 1837

Species of beetle

Calathus baeticus is a species of ground beetle from the Platyninae subfamily that is endemic to Spain.
