= Calathus montivagus =

Scientific classification
- Kingdom: Animalia
- Phylum: Arthropoda
- Class: Insecta
- Order: Coleoptera
- Suborder: Adephaga
- Family: Carabidae
- Genus: Calathus
- Species: C. montivagus

Binomial name
- Calathus montivagus Dejean, 1831

Synonyms
- Calathus bellieri Gautier des Cottes, 1867; Calathus calabrus Leoni, 1908

Species of beetle

Calathus montivagus is a species of ground beetle from the Platyninae subfamily that can be found in Italy and Sicily.
