= Calathus oertzeni =

Scientific classification
- Kingdom: Animalia
- Phylum: Arthropoda
- Class: Insecta
- Order: Coleoptera
- Suborder: Adephaga
- Family: Carabidae
- Genus: Calathus
- Species: C. oertzeni

Binomial name
- Calathus oertzeni Jeanne & F. Battoni, 1988

Species of beetle

Calathus oertzeni is a species of ground beetle from the Platyninae subfamily that is endemic to Crete.
