= Calathus pirazzolii =

Scientific classification
- Kingdom: Animalia
- Phylum: Arthropoda
- Clade: Pancrustacea
- Class: Insecta
- Order: Coleoptera
- Suborder: Adephaga
- Family: Carabidae
- Genus: Calathus
- Species: C. pirazzolii

Binomial name
- Calathus pirazzolii Putzeys, 1873

Species of beetle

Calathus pirazzolii is a species of ground beetle from the Platyninae subfamily that is endemic to Italy.
