= Calathus freyi =

Scientific classification
- Kingdom: Animalia
- Phylum: Arthropoda
- Class: Insecta
- Order: Coleoptera
- Suborder: Adephaga
- Family: Carabidae
- Genus: Calathus
- Species: C. freyi

Binomial name
- Calathus freyi Colas, 1941

Species of beetle

Calathus freyi is a species of ground beetle from the Platyninae from the Platyninae subfamily. It is endemic to Tenerife, the Canary Islands. It occurs at the forest margins of the monteverde forest or in the drier woods of warmer areas.
