= Calathus rotundatus =

Scientific classification
- Kingdom: Animalia
- Phylum: Arthropoda
- Class: Insecta
- Order: Coleoptera
- Suborder: Adephaga
- Family: Carabidae
- Genus: Calathus
- Species: C. rotundatus

Binomial name
- Calathus rotundatus Jacquelin du Val, 1857

Species of beetle

Calathus rotundatus is a species of ground beetle from the Platyninae subfamily. It can be found in Portugal and Spain.
