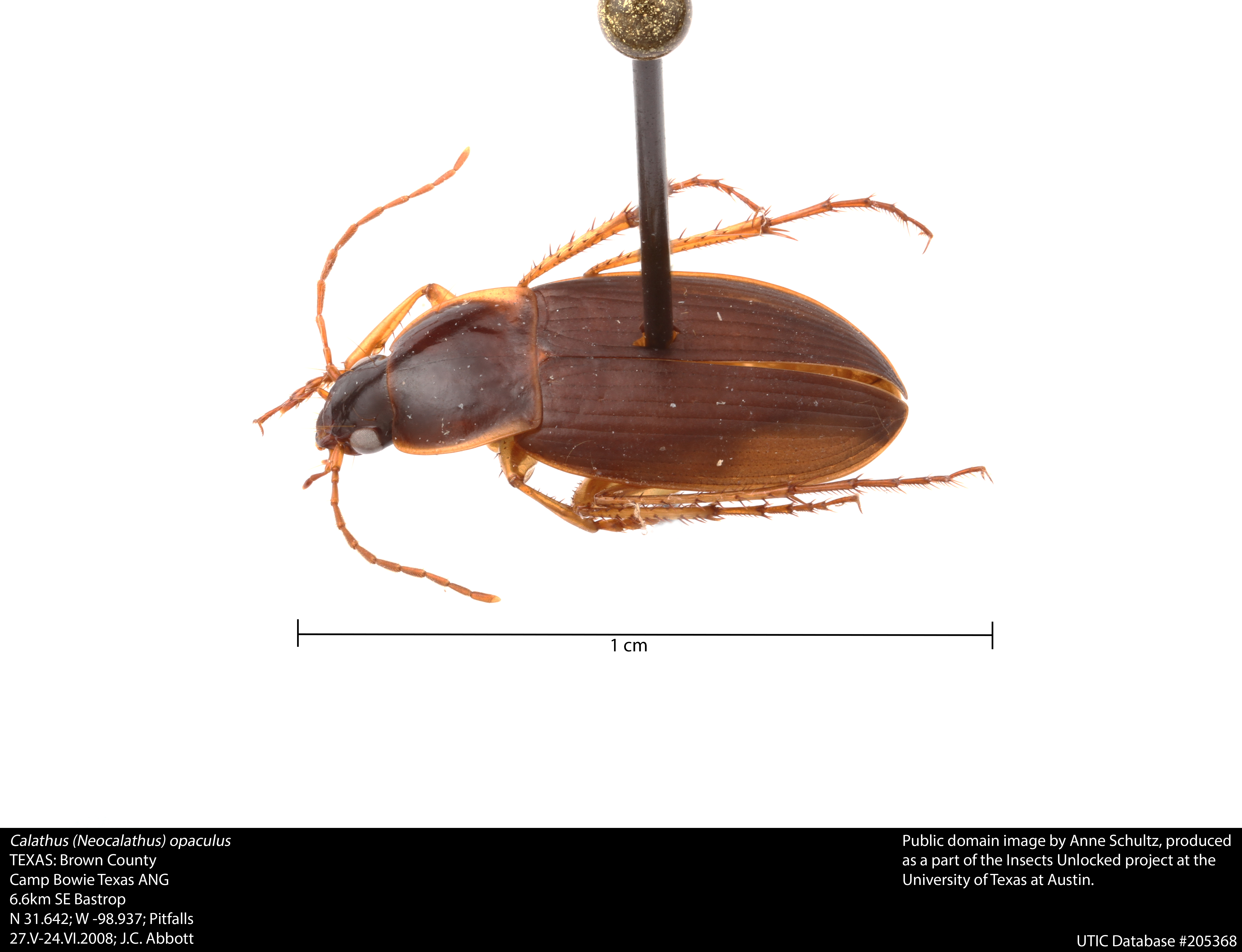

Scientific classification
- Domain: Eukaryota
- Kingdom: Animalia
- Phylum: Arthropoda
- Class: Insecta
- Order: Coleoptera
- Suborder: Adephaga
- Family: Carabidae
- Genus: Calathus
- Species: C. opaculus

Binomial name
- Calathus opaculus Leconte, 1854

= Calathus opaculus =

Species of beetle

Calathus opaculus is a species of ground beetle in the family Carabidae. It is found in North America.
