= Calathus rubripes =

Scientific classification
- Kingdom: Animalia
- Phylum: Arthropoda
- Class: Insecta
- Order: Coleoptera
- Suborder: Adephaga
- Family: Carabidae
- Genus: Calathus
- Species: C. rubripes

Binomial name
- Calathus rubripes Dejean, 1831

Species of beetle

Calathus rubripes is a species of ground beetle from the Platyninae subfamily that can be found in Italy and Switzerland.
