= Camptodontus (beetle) =

Scientific classification
- Kingdom: Animalia
- Phylum: Arthropoda
- Class: Insecta
- Order: Coleoptera
- Suborder: Adephaga
- Family: Carabidae
- Subfamily: Scaritinae
- Genus: Camptodonus; Dejean, 1826

Genus of beetles

Camptodontus is a genus of beetles in the family Carabidae, containing the following species:

- Camptodontus amazonum Putzeys, 1866
- Camptodontus amrishi Makhan, 2010
- Camptodontus anglicanus (Stephens, 1827)
- Camptodontus cayennensis Dejean, 1826
- Camptodontus crenatus Brullė, 1837
- Camptodontus falcatus Putzeys, 1861
- Camptodontus forcipatus Putzeys, 1866
- Camptodontus interstitialis Putzeys, 1866
- Camptodontus isthmius H. W. Bates, 1881
- Camptodontus longicollis Putzeys, 1866
- Camptodontus longipennis Putzeys, 1866
- Camptodontus obliteratus Putzeys, 1866
- Camptodontus puncticeps Putzeys, 1861
- Camptodontus reichei Putzeys, 1861
- Camptodontus trisulcus Brullé, 1837
