= Calathus ellipticus =

Scientific classification
- Kingdom: Animalia
- Phylum: Arthropoda
- Class: Insecta
- Order: Coleoptera
- Suborder: Adephaga
- Family: Carabidae
- Genus: Calathus
- Species: C. ellipticus

Binomial name
- Calathus ellipticus Reitter, 1889

Species of beetle

Calathus ellipticus is a species of ground beetle from the Platyninae subfamily that can be found in Bulgaria and Greece.
