= Calathus ravasinii =

Scientific classification
- Kingdom: Animalia
- Phylum: Arthropoda
- Class: Insecta
- Order: Coleoptera
- Suborder: Adephaga
- Family: Carabidae
- Genus: Calathus
- Species: C. ravasinii

Binomial name
- Calathus ravasinii G. Muller, 1935

Species of beetle

Calathus ravasinii is a species of ground beetle from the Platyninae subfamily that can be found in Albania, Greece and North Macedonia.
