= Calathus distinguendus =

Scientific classification
- Kingdom: Animalia
- Phylum: Arthropoda
- Class: Insecta
- Order: Coleoptera
- Suborder: Adephaga
- Family: Carabidae
- Genus: Calathus
- Species: C. distinguendus

Binomial name
- Calathus distinguendus Chaudoir, 1846

Synonyms
- Calathus subsimilis Gautier des Cottes, 1870

Species of beetle

Calathus distinguendus is a species of ground beetle from the Platyninae subfamily that can be found in Bulgaria, Greece, Kosovo, Moldova, Montenegro, North Macedonia, Serbia, Voivodina, southern part of Russia and European part of Turkey. It is also found in Georgia, Asia Minor, Caucasus, and Crimea. It have 1 millimetre (0.039 in) long genitalia.
