= Calathus korax =

Scientific classification
- Kingdom: Animalia
- Phylum: Arthropoda
- Class: Insecta
- Order: Coleoptera
- Suborder: Adephaga
- Family: Carabidae
- Genus: Calathus
- Species: C. korax

Binomial name
- Calathus korax Reitter, 1889

Species of beetle

Calathus korax is a species of ground beetle from the Platyninae subfamily that is endemic to Greece.
