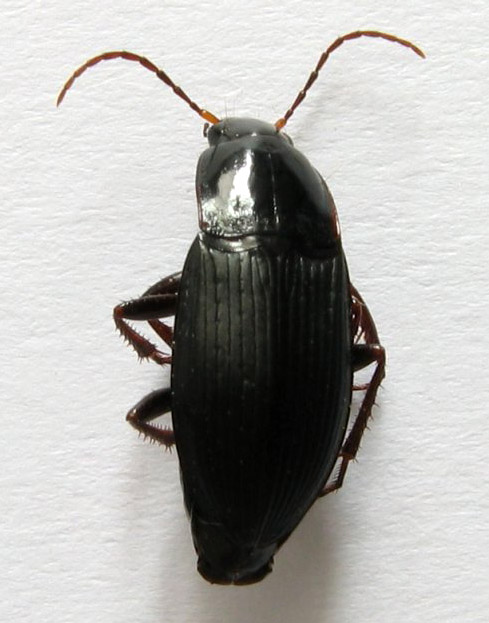

Scientific classification
- Kingdom: Animalia
- Phylum: Arthropoda
- Clade: Pancrustacea
- Class: Insecta
- Order: Coleoptera
- Suborder: Adephaga
- Family: Carabidae
- Genus: Calathus
- Species: C. fuscipes

Binomial name
- Calathus fuscipes (Goeze, 1777)

Synonyms
- Carabus fuscipes Goeze, 1777; Carabus cisteloides Panzer, 1793; Carabus frigidus Fabricius, 1801; Buprestis leporinus Geoffroy, 1785; Calathus planipennis Germar, 1824; Calathus rossii Depoli, 1929; Calathus violatus Germar, 1824

= Calathus fuscipes =

Species of beetle

Calathus fuscipes is a species of ground beetle from the Platyninae subfamily that can be found everywhere in Europe except for Andorra, Monaco, San Marino, Vatican City and various islands.

== Description ==
Calathus fuscipes specimens are 10-14 mm in length, the body is black and the legs are red to black in color. The pronotum is slightly rounded.
