= Calathus amplior =

Scientific classification
- Kingdom: Animalia
- Phylum: Arthropoda
- Clade: Pancrustacea
- Class: Insecta
- Order: Coleoptera
- Suborder: Adephaga
- Family: Carabidae
- Genus: Calathus
- Species: C. amplior

Binomial name
- Calathus amplior Escalera, 1921

Synonyms
- Calathus amplius Escalera, 1921

Species of beetle

Calathus amplior is a species of ground beetle from the Platyninae subfamily that is endemic to the Canary Islands.
