= Calathus peltatus =

Scientific classification
- Kingdom: Animalia
- Phylum: Arthropoda
- Class: Insecta
- Order: Coleoptera
- Suborder: Adephaga
- Family: Carabidae
- Genus: Calathus
- Species: C. peltatus

Binomial name
- Calathus peltatus Kolenati, 1845

Species of beetle

Calathus peltatus is a species of ground beetle from the Platyninae subfamily that can be found in southern part of Russia and East Palaearctic.
