= Calathus bosnicus =

Scientific classification
- Kingdom: Animalia
- Phylum: Arthropoda
- Class: Insecta
- Order: Coleoptera
- Suborder: Adephaga
- Family: Carabidae
- Genus: Calathus
- Species: C. bosnicus

Binomial name
- Calathus bosnicus Ganglbauer, 1891

Species of beetle

Calathus bosnicus is a species of ground beetle from the Platyninae subfamily that is can be found in Albania and Bosnia and Herzegovina.
