= Calathus ruficollis =

Scientific classification
- Kingdom: Animalia
- Phylum: Arthropoda
- Clade: Pancrustacea
- Class: Insecta
- Order: Coleoptera
- Suborder: Adephaga
- Family: Carabidae
- Genus: Calathus
- Species: C. ruficollis

Binomial name
- Calathus ruficollis Dejean, 1828

Species of beetle

Calathus ruficollis is a species of ground beetle in the family Carabidae. It is found in western North America, covering the California Floristic Province and continuing to the Pacific Northwest. Calathus ruficollis is flightless, predaceous, and nocturnal.

== Subspecies ==
These four subspecies belong to the species Calathus ruficollis:

- Calathus ruficollis grandicollis Casey, 1920
  - Range: southwestern British Columbia to Humboldt County, California
- Calathus ruficollis guadalupensis Casey, 1897
- Calathus ruficollis ignicollis Casey, 1920
  - Range: eastern Washington, western Idaho, south to central California (including Sierra Nevada)
- Calathus ruficollis ruficollis Dejean, 1828
  - Range: Mendocino County in California to Baja California and southern Arizona. Introduced in Hawaii.
