= Calathus albanicus =

Scientific classification
- Kingdom: Animalia
- Phylum: Arthropoda
- Class: Insecta
- Order: Coleoptera
- Suborder: Adephaga
- Family: Carabidae
- Genus: Calathus
- Species: C. albanicus

Binomial name
- Calathus albanicus Apfelbeck, 1906

Species of beetle

Calathus albanicus is a species of ground beetle from the Platyninae subfamily, found in Albania, Kosovo, Montenegro, North Macedonia, Serbia, and Vojvodina.
