= Calathus extensicollis =

Conservation status
- Extinct (IUCN 3.1)

Scientific classification
- Kingdom: Animalia
- Phylum: Arthropoda
- Class: Insecta
- Order: Coleoptera
- Suborder: Adephaga
- Family: Carabidae
- Genus: Calathus
- Species: †C. extensicollis

Binomial name
- †Calathus extensicollis Putzeys, 1873

Synonyms
- Calathus mollis Marsh.

Species of beetle

Calathus extensicollis is a species of ground beetle from the Platyninae subfamily that was endemic to the island of Pico, Azores. It is considered extinct, as the last recorded individual dates from 1859.
