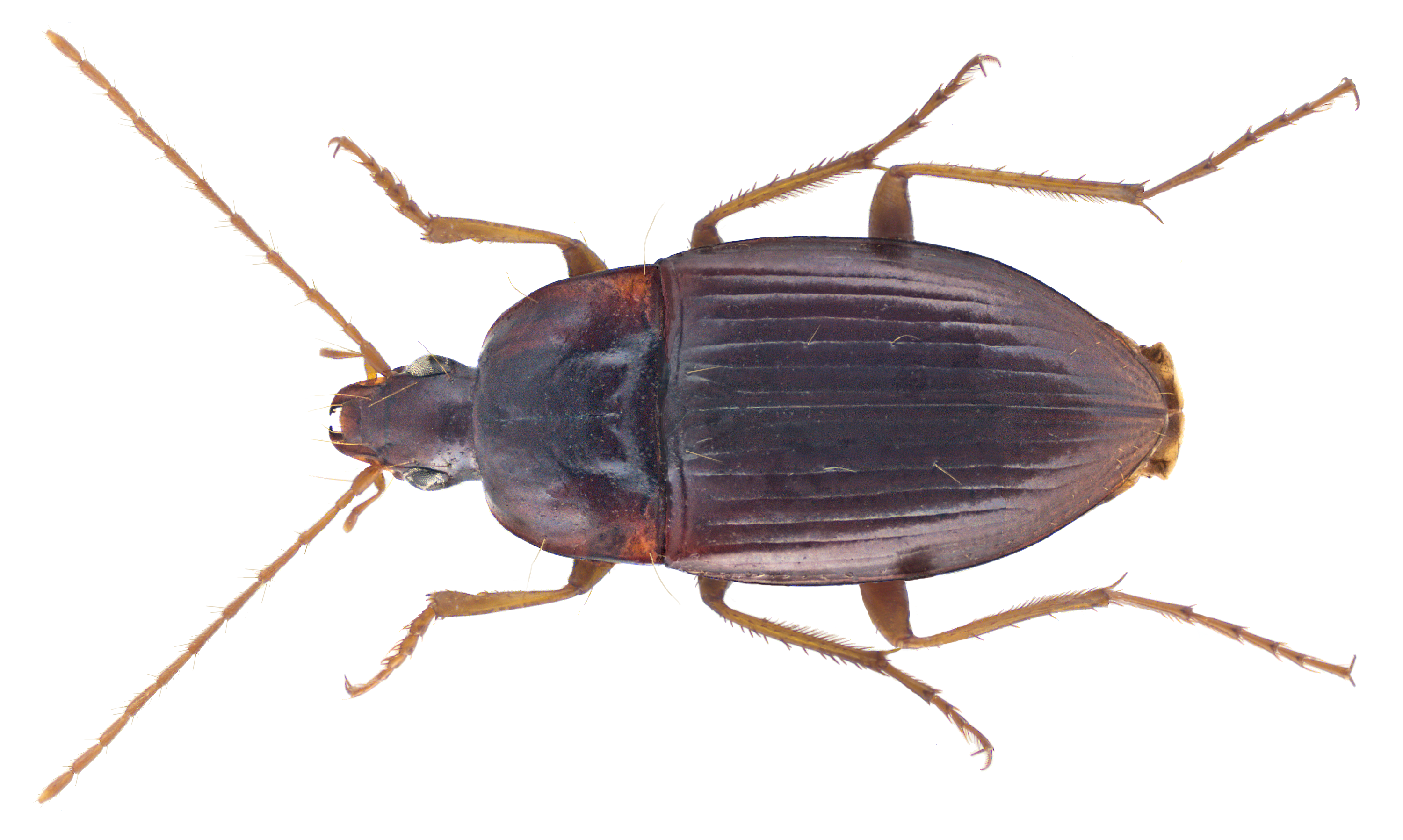
- Calathus abaxoides

Scientific classification
- Kingdom: Animalia
- Phylum: Arthropoda
- Clade: Pancrustacea
- Class: Insecta
- Order: Coleoptera
- Suborder: Adephaga
- Family: Carabidae
- Subfamily: Platyninae
- Tribe: Sphodrini
- Subtribe: Calathina
- Genus: Calathus; Bonelli, 1810

Synonyms
- Amphigynus Haliday, 1841; Bedelinus Ragusa, 1885; Bedelius Jacobson, 1892; Calathrus Bonelli, 1810; Fuscocalathus Negre, 1969; Iberocalathus Toribio, 2006; Lauricalathus Machado, 1992; Lindrothius Kurnakov, 1961; Neocalathus Ball & Nègre, 1972; Omodactylus Gautier, 1869; Procalathus Jedlicka, 1954; Tachalus Ball & Nègre, 1972; Trichocalathus Bolívar y Pieltain, 1940

= Calathus (beetle) =

Genus of ground beetles

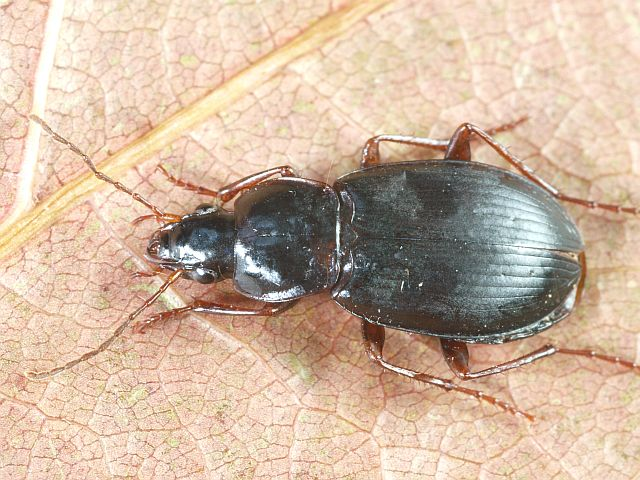
Calathus rotundicollis

Calathus is a genus of ground beetle native to the Palearctic (including Europe, the Near East, and North Africa). There are at least 190 described species in Calathus.

The genus includes species that present different forms in relation to wing length. In some species, this phenotype is determined by a single locus gene, in which short wings are dominant. Other species, however, have lost this polymorphism, expressing either the short-winged morph or the long-winged morph. One species, Calanthus melanocephalus, still presents both forms, but they're determined by the environment, specifically temperature and food conditions, instead of depending on the genotype of the individual, in what's called polyphenism.

== Species ==
These 198 species belong to the genus Calathus

Subgenus Amphyginus Haliday, 1841
Calathus rotundicollis Dejean, 1828
Subgenus Bedelinus Ragusa, 1885
Calathus circumseptus Germar, 1823
Subgenus Calathus (beetle)|Calathus Bonelli, 1810
Calathus acuticollis Putzeys, 1873
Calathus alternans Faldermann, 1836
Calathus arcuatus Gautier des Cottes, 1870
Calathus atitari Novoa, 1999
Calathus baeticus Rambur, 1837
Calathus bosnicus Ganglbauer, 1891
Calathus brevis Gautier des Cottes, 1866
Calathus busii F.Battoni, 1984
Calathus casalei F.Battoni, 1986
Calathus distinguendus Chaudoir, 1846
Calathus ellipticus Reitter, 1889
Calathus erzeliki Schweiger, 1977
Calathus focarilei Schatzmayr, 1947
Calathus fracassii Heyden, 1908
Calathus fuscipes (Goeze, 1777)
Calathus giganteus Dejean, 1828
Calathus glabricollis Dejean, 1828
Calathus granatensis Vuillefroy, 1866
Calathus heinzianus F.Battoni, 1986
Calathus hispanicus Gautier des Cottes, 1866
Calathus jakupicensis B.V.Gueorguiev, 2008
Calathus kirschenhoferianus F.Battoni, 1986
Calathus korax Reitter, 1889
Calathus libanensis Putzeys, 1873
Calathus lissoderus Putzeys, 1873
Calathus longicollis Motschulsky, 1865
Calathus luctuosus (Latreille, 1804)
Calathus malacensis Nègre, 1966
Calathus minutus Gautier des Cottes, 1866
Calathus mirei Nègre, 1966
Calathus moralesi Nègre, 1966
Calathus muchei Jedlicka, 1961
Calathus oertzeni Jeanne & F.Battoni, 1987
Calathus opacus Lucas, 1846
Calathus ordinatus Gautier des Cottes, 1870
Calathus oreades Nègre, 1966
Calathus pirazzolii Putzeys, 1873
Calathus ravasinii G.Müller, 1935
Calathus reflexicollis Faldermann, 1839
Calathus reflexus Schaum, 1858
Calathus roccai F.Battoni, 1984
Calathus rubripes Dejean, 1831
Calathus sirentensis D'Amore Fracassi, 1908
Calathus syriacus Chaudoir, 1863
Calathus uniseriatus Vuillefroy, 1866
Calathus vignatagliantii F.Battoni, 1986
Calathus vivesi Nègre, 1966
Calathus vuillefroyi Gautier des Cottes, 1867
Calathus zabroides Putzeys, 1873
Subgenus Certocalathus J.Schmidt & Will, 2020
Calathus advena (LeConte, 1846)
Subgenus Denticalathus J.Schmidt, 2018
Calathus aethiopicus Alluaud, 1918
Calathus aethiops Alluaud, 1937
Calathus afroalpinus Lassalle, 2016
Calathus ankoberensis Lassalle, 2016
Calathus baleensis Lassalle, 2016
Calathus balli Novoa; Gañan & Baselga, 2015
Calathus carballalae Novoa & Gañán, 2014
Calathus chioriae Lassalle, 2016
Calathus chokeensis Lassalle, 2016
Calathus dubaulti Lassalle, 2016
Calathus gugheensis Basilewsky, 1953
Calathus gunaensis Lassalle, 2016
Calathus juan Novoa & Gañán, 2014
Calathus kebedei Novoa; Gañan & Baselga, 2015
Calathus montanus Alluaud, 1937
Calathus nitidus Basilewsky, 1957
Calathus ollivieri Lassalle, 2016
Calathus oreobius Alluaud, 1937
Calathus orthomoides Alluaud, 1932
Calathus parvicollis Fairmaire, 1882
Calathus patrizii Basilewsky, 1953
Calathus queinneci Lassalle, 2016
Calathus ras Basilewsky, 1957
Calathus reebae Lassalle, 2016
Calathus scotti Alluaud, 1937
Calathus scottianus Basilewsky, 1953
Calathus shoanus Alluaud, 1932
Calathus simienensis Basilewsky, 1957
Calathus theodori Ancey, 1882
Calathus trapezicollis Alluaud, 1937
Calathus vagestriatus Fairmaire, 1882
Calathus wolloensis Lassalle, 2016
Subgenus Iberocalathus Toribio, 2006
Calathus rotundatus Jacquelin du Val, 1855
Subgenus Indocalathus J.Schmidt, 2018
Calathus kirschenhoferi F.Battoni, 1982
Subgenus Lauricalathus Machado, 1992
Calathus abaxoides Brullé, 1839
Calathus amplius Escalera, 1921
Calathus angularis Brullé, 1839
Calathus angustulus Wollaston, 1862
Calathus appendiculatus Wollaston, 1862
Calathus ascendens Wollaston, 1862
Calathus auctus Wollaston, 1862
Calathus canariensis Harold, 1868
Calathus carinatus Brullé, 1839
Calathus ciliatus Wollaston, 1862
Calathus cognatus Wollaston, 1864
Calathus depressus Brullé, 1836
Calathus freyi Colas, 1941
Calathus gomerensis Colas, 1943
Calathus laureticola Wollaston, 1865
Calathus marcellae Colas, 1943
Calathus rectus Wollaston, 1862
Calathus rufocastaneus Wollaston, 1862
Calathus spretus Wollaston, 1862
Subgenus Lindrothius Kurnakov, 1961
Calathus aeneocupreus (Heinz, 1971)
Calathus aequistriatus (Kurnakov, 1961)
Calathus caucasicus Chaudoir, 1846
Calathus grandiceps (Kurnakov, 1961)
Calathus horsti (Reitter, 1888)
Calathus laticaudis (Kurnakov, 1961)
Calathus mandibularis (Kurnakov, 1961)
Calathus praestans (Heyden, 1885)
Calathus pseudopraestans (Kurnakov, 1961)
Calathus recticaudis (Kurnakov, 1961)
Calathus robustus (Kurnakov, 1961)
Calathus sotshiensis (Zamotajlov, 1997)
Calathus stricticaudis (Kurnakov, 1961)
Calathus subpraestans (Kurnakov, 1961)
Subgenus Neocalathus Ball & Nègre, 1972
Calathus albanicus Apfelbeck, 1906
Calathus ambigens Bates, 1891
Calathus ambiguus (Paykull, 1790)
Calathus anistschenkoi Berlov & Ippolitova, 2005
Calathus asturiensis Vuillefroy, 1866
Calathus aztec Ball & Nègre, 1972
Calathus bolivari Nègre, 1968
Calathus calceus Ball & Nègre, 1972
Calathus cinctus Motschulsky, 1850
Calathus clauseni Ball & Nègre, 1972
Calathus deplanatus Chaudoir, 1843
Calathus deyrollei Gautier des Cottes, 1870
Calathus durango Ball & Nègre, 1972
Calathus erratus (C.R.Sahlberg, 1827)
Calathus erwini Ball & Nègre, 1972
Calathus extensicollis Putzeys, 1873
Calathus femoralis Chaudoir, 1846
Calathus gonzalezi Mateu, 1956
Calathus gregarius (Say, 1823)
Calathus hyrcanus Heinz, 1970
Calathus ingratus Dejean, 1828
Calathus kollari Putzeys, 1873
Calathus leechi Ball & Nègre, 1972
Calathus leptodactylus Putzeys, 1873
Calathus lundbladi Colas, 1938
Calathus marmoreus Ball & Nègre, 1972
Calathus melanocephalus (Linnaeus, 1758)
Calathus metallicus Dejean, 1828
Calathus mexicanus Chaudoir, 1837
Calathus micropterus (Duftschmid, 1812)
Calathus mollis (Marsham, 1802)
Calathus opaculus LeConte, 1854
Calathus peltatus Kolenati, 1845
Calathus peropacus Casey, 1920
Calathus pommeranzi J.Schmidt, 1999
Calathus potosi Ball & Nègre, 1972
Calathus relictus J.Schmidt & Tian, 2013
Calathus rhaticus Antoine, 1941
Calathus rotgeri Ball & Nègre, 1972
Calathus ruficollis Dejean, 1828
Calathus semisericeus Fairmaire, 1879
Calathus simplicicollis Wollaston, 1862
Calathus solieri Bassi, 1834
Calathus subfuscus Wollaston, 1865
Calathus vicenteorum Schatzmayr, 1937
Calathus whiteheadi Ball & Nègre, 1972
Calathus wittmerianus Deuve; Lassalle & Queinnec, 1985
†Calathus elpis Ortuño & Arillo, 2009
Subgenus Spinocalathus J.Schmidt, 2018
Calathus annapurnae J.Schmidt, 1999
Calathus deliae Morvan, 1999
Calathus fabigi J.Schmidt, 2018
Calathus ganeshi J.Schmidt, 2018
Calathus gorkhaorum J.Schmidt, 2018
Calathus hastatus J.Schmidt, 2018
Calathus heinertzi Deuve; Lassalle & Queinnec, 1985
Calathus holzschuhi Kirschenhofer, 1990
Calathus kryzhanovskii J.Schmidt, 1999
Calathus manasluensis J.Schmidt, 1999
Calathus shikaensis J.Schmidt, 2018
Calathus vulneratus J.Schmidt, 2018
Subgenus Synuchidius Apfelbeck, 1908
Calathus ganglbaueri (Apfelbeck, 1908)
Subgenus Tachalus Ball & Nègre, 1972
Calathus ovipennis Putzeys, 1873
Subgenus Trichocalathus Bolivar y Pieltain, 1940
Calathus obliteratus Wollaston, 1865
Calathus pilosipennis Machado, 1992
Calathus refleximargo Machado, 1992
Subgenus unassigned
Calathus algens Andrewes, 1934
Calathus anatolicus Jedlicka, 1969
Calathus carvalhoi Serrano & Borges, 1986
Calathus colasianus Mateu, 1970
Calathus complanatus Dejean, 1828
Calathus fimbriatus Wollaston, 1858
Calathus gelascens Andrewes, 1934
Calathus himalayae Bates, 1891
Calathus montanellus Heinz, 2000
Calathus montivagus Dejean, 1831
Calathus pecoudi Colas, 1938
Calathus suffuscus Andrewes, 1934
Calathus tombesii F.Battoni, 1976
Calathus vividus (Fabricius, 1801)
