= Calathus gomerensis =

Scientific classification
- Kingdom: Animalia
- Phylum: Arthropoda
- Class: Insecta
- Order: Coleoptera
- Suborder: Adephaga
- Family: Carabidae
- Genus: Calathus
- Species: C. gomerensis

Binomial name
- Calathus gomerensis Colas, 1943

Species of beetle

Calathus gomerensis is a species of ground beetle from the Platyninae subfamily that is endemic to Canary Islands.
