= Calathus giganteus =

Scientific classification
- Kingdom: Animalia
- Phylum: Arthropoda
- Class: Insecta
- Order: Coleoptera
- Suborder: Adephaga
- Family: Carabidae
- Genus: Calathus
- Species: C. giganteus

Binomial name
- Calathus giganteus Dejean, 1828

Synonyms
- Calathus impressicollis Visart, 1890; Calathus ovalis Dejean & Boisduval, 1830

Species of beetle

Calathus giganteus is a species of ground beetle from the Platyninae subfamily that can be found in Albania and Greece.
