= Calathus syriacus =

Scientific classification
- Kingdom: Animalia
- Phylum: Arthropoda
- Class: Insecta
- Order: Coleoptera
- Suborder: Adephaga
- Family: Carabidae
- Genus: Calathus
- Species: C. syriacus

Binomial name
- Calathus syriacus Chaudoir, 1863

Species of beetle

Calathus syriacus is a species of ground beetle from the Platyninae subfamily that can be found on Cyprus, in Ukraine and in southern part of Russia. It is also found in Azerbaijan, Armenia, Georgia, Greece, Iran, Israel, Lebanon, Syria and Turkey.
