= Félix de Vuillefroy-Cassini =

French painter, engraver and entomologist

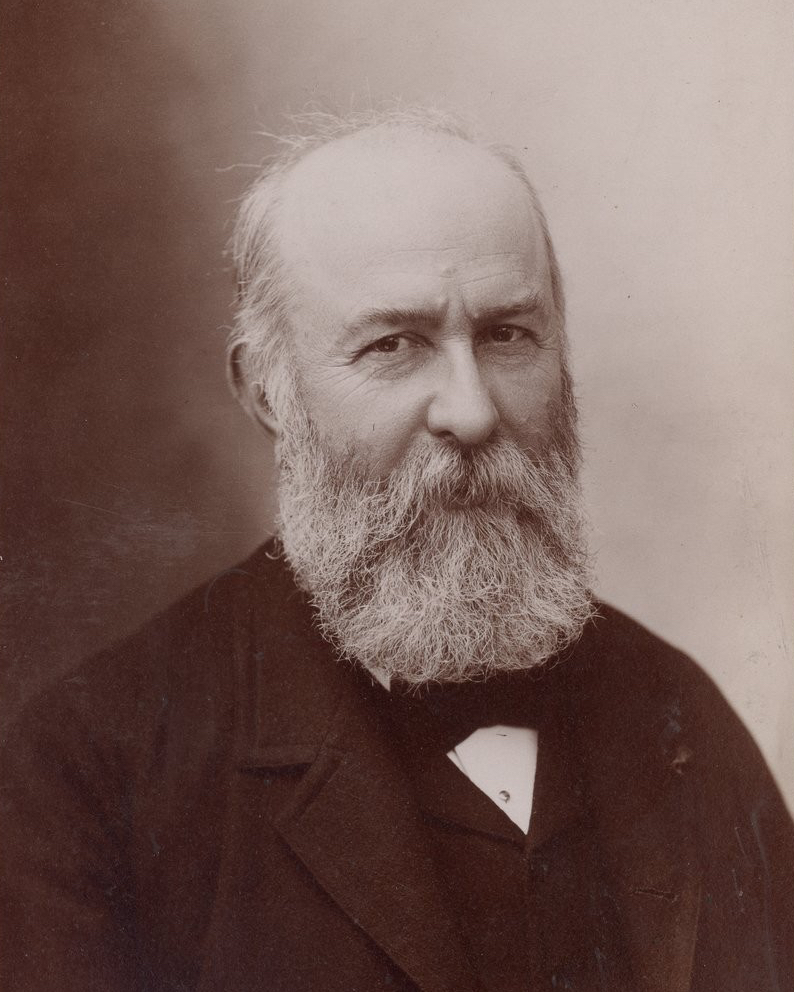

Félix Dominique de Vuillefroy-Cassini (March 2, 1841 – February 1, 1916) was a French painter, engraver and entomologist. As an artist he was particularly well-known as an animalier, depicting cattle in many of his works showing pastoral scenes. As an entomologist, he collected insects on his travels and the beetles Nebria vuillefroyi and Metadonus vuillefroyanus were named after him while a few new species were described by him.

== Life and work ==
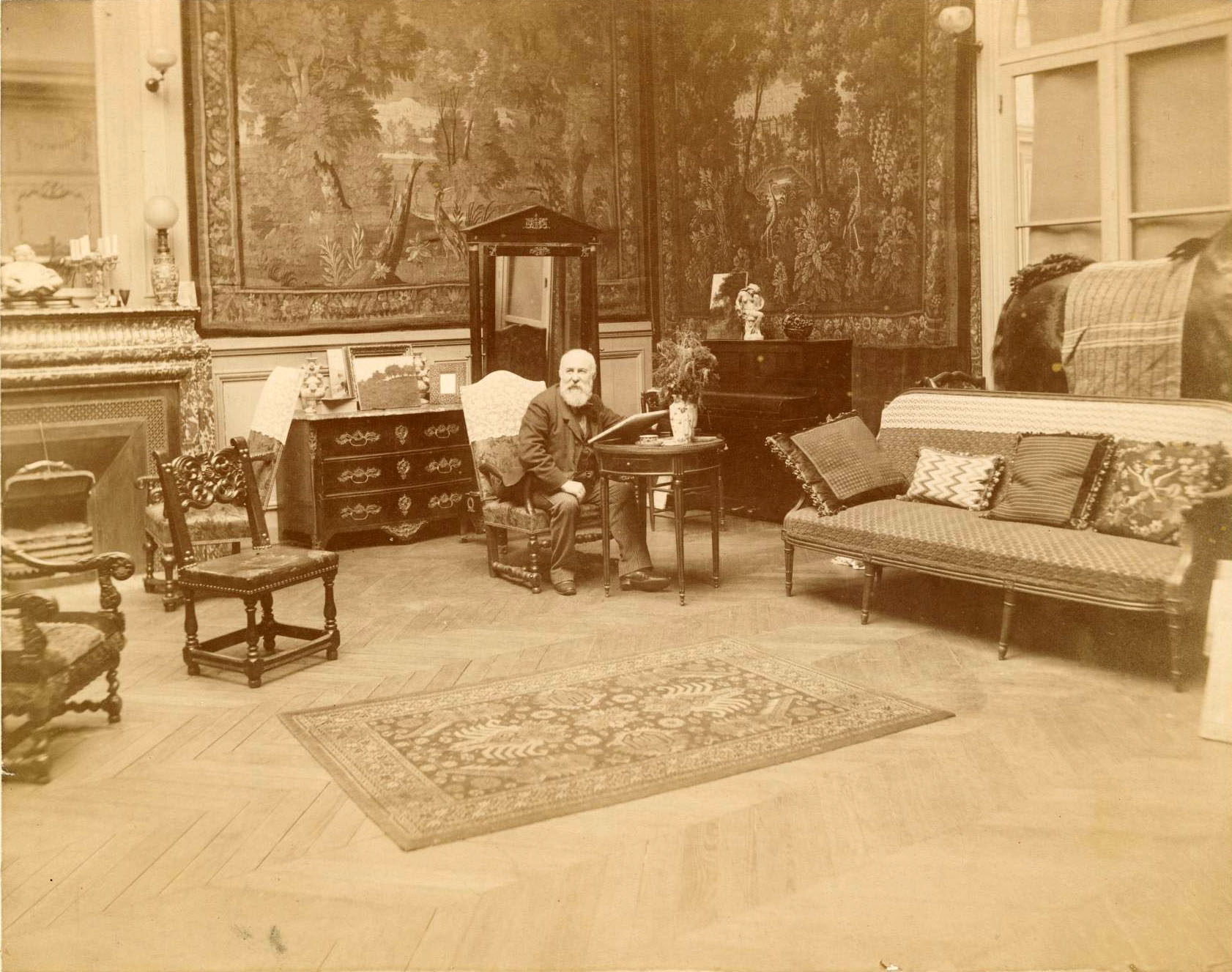
In his Atelier

Vuillefroy-Cassini was born in La Madeleine, Paris, the son of Charles-Amédée de Vuillefroy de Silly (1810-1878) and Felicie Feuillade (1822-1843). He grew up in the family Château de Fillerval (which belonged to the famous Cassini family) and after the early death of his mother, he was raised by his grandmother. He studied law and enter the Conseil d'Etat in 1864 while also studying art first under Ernest Hébert (1817-1908) and then from 1868 under Léon Bonnat (1833-1922). He began to paint realistic paintings from 1867 when he exhibited at the Salon for the first time. He then left his work at the Council of State and spent more time on painting and bought a house at Chailly-en-Bière. He was influenced by the Barbizon school of art after moving to the new house. He joined the Entomological Society of France in 1861 and in 1865, he travelled to Spain with other entomologists and collected insects. The beetles Nebria vuillefroyi and Metadonus vuillefroyanus were named after him while he described a few species of bugs including Appasus japonicus. In 1880 he was appointed a knight of the Legion of Honour. He was involved in the creation of the Société des artistes français in 1881. Vuillefroy-Cassini married Amélie Gélot de Saint-Amey (1844-1901) in 1887 after she separated from the novelist Albert Delpit (1849-1893). He received a gold medal in 1889 during the Exposition Universelle. His health declined from 1890s and he sold his Drouot studio in 1907. His last exhibition was in 1913. World War I caused a decline in his fortunes and he left his Paris studio that he bought in 1882 and lived at Maisons-Laffitte where he died. His burial location is unknown.

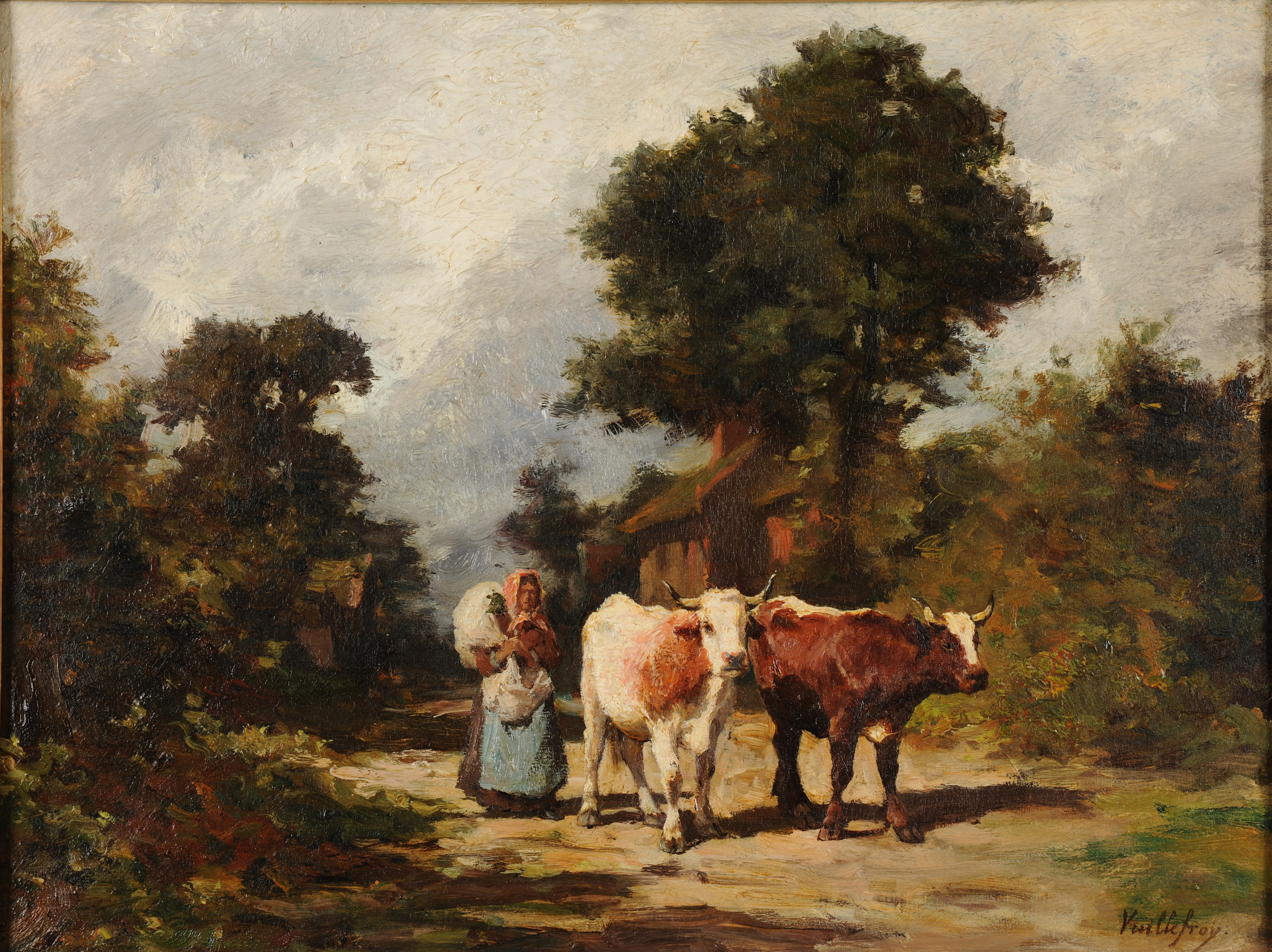
Le retour à la ferme, 1887

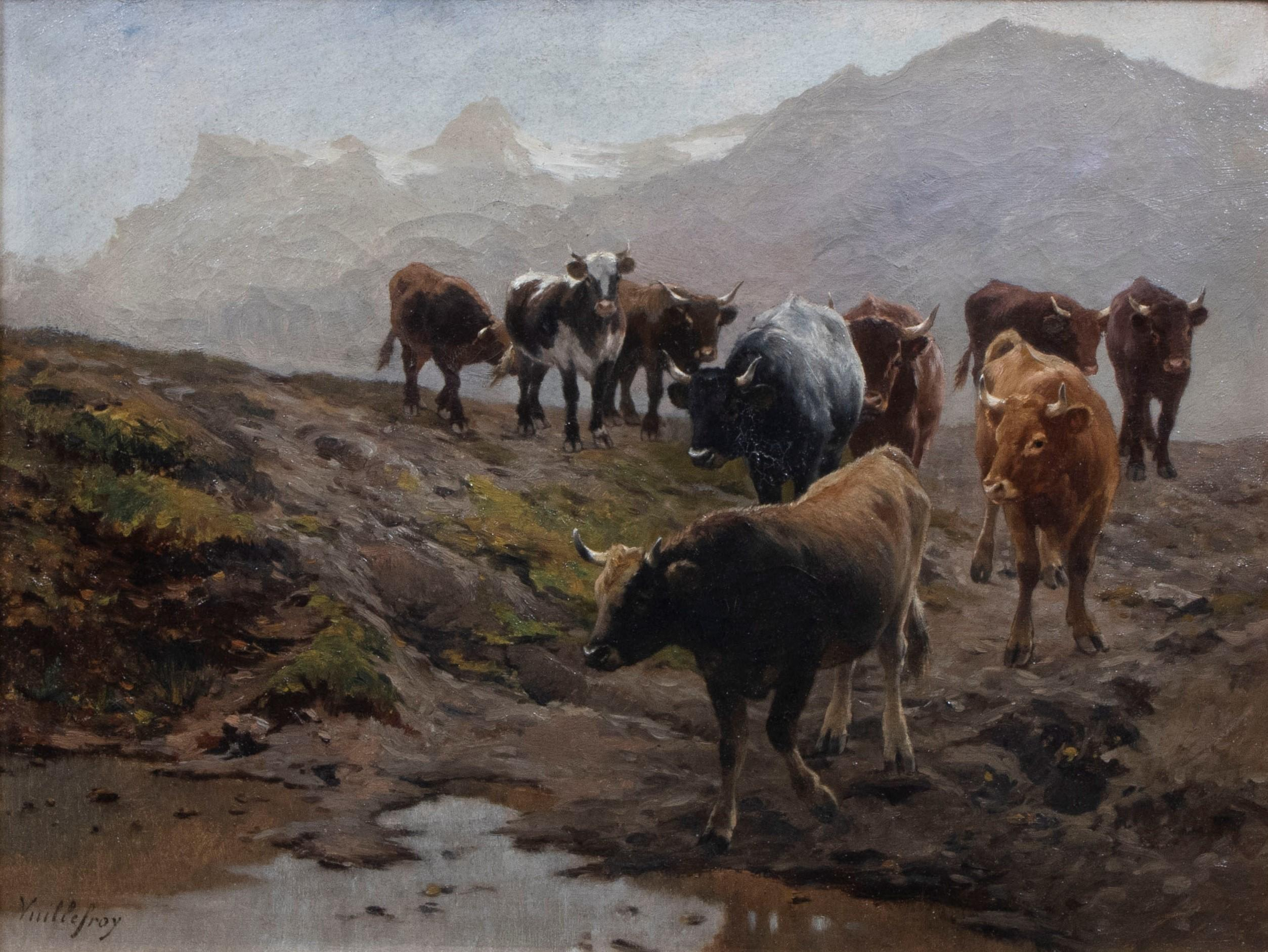

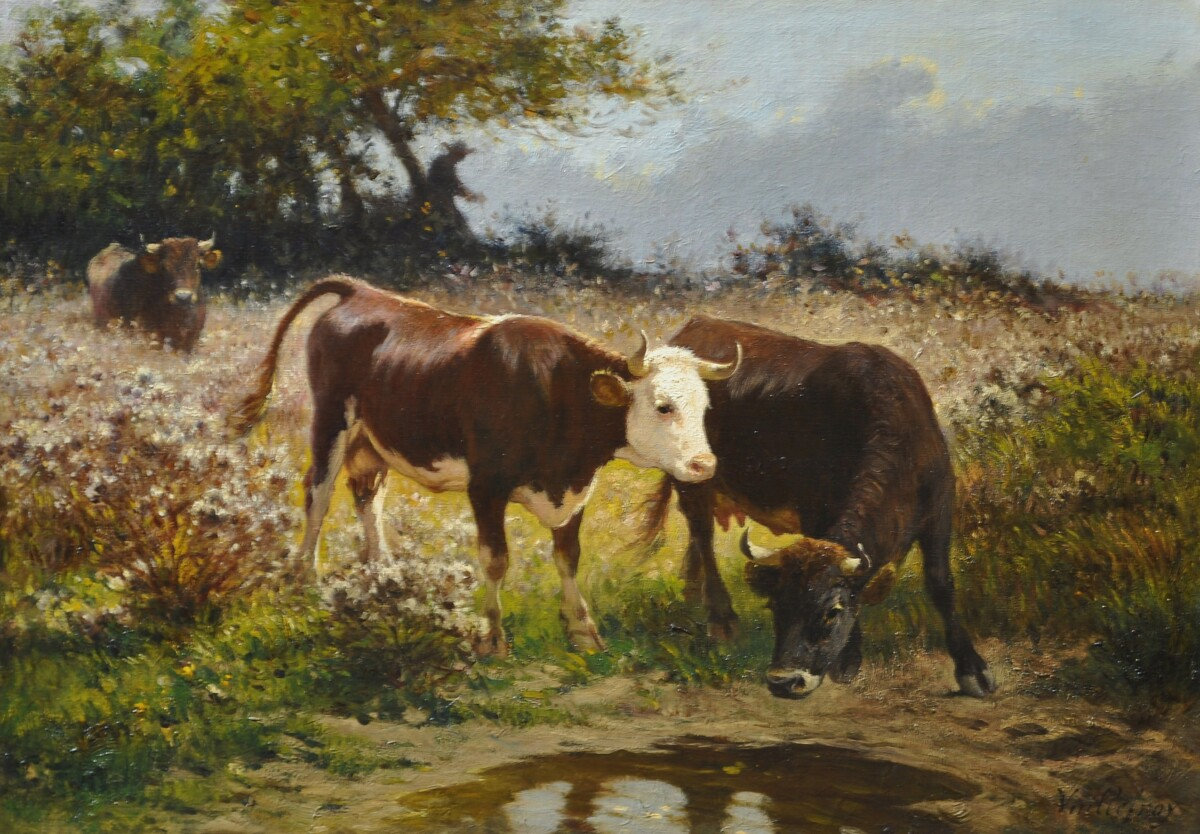

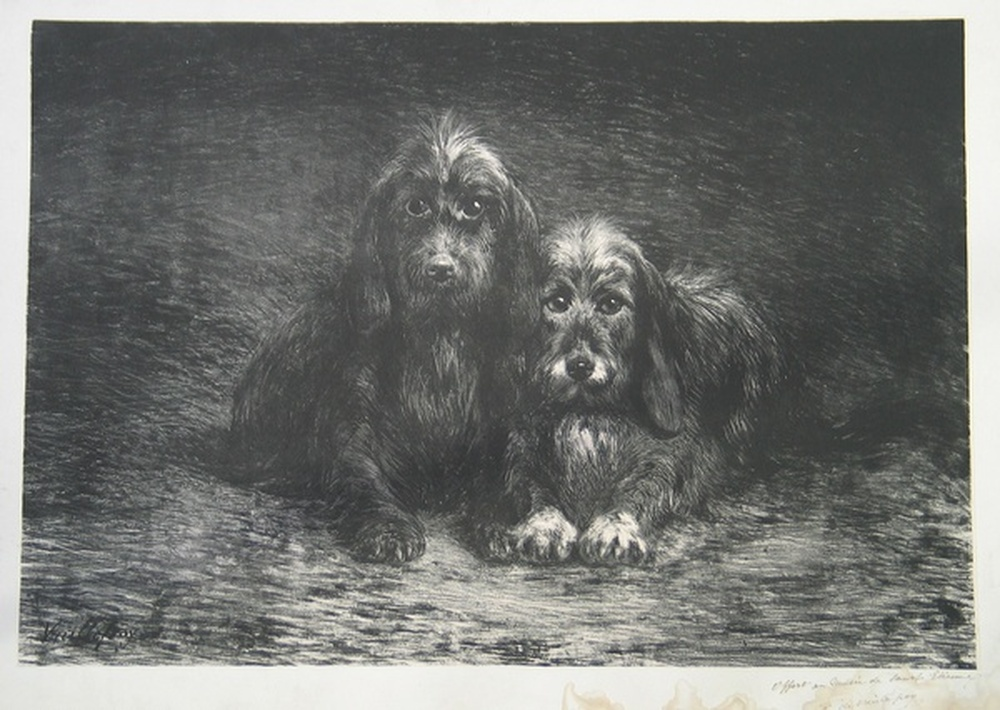
Deux chiens

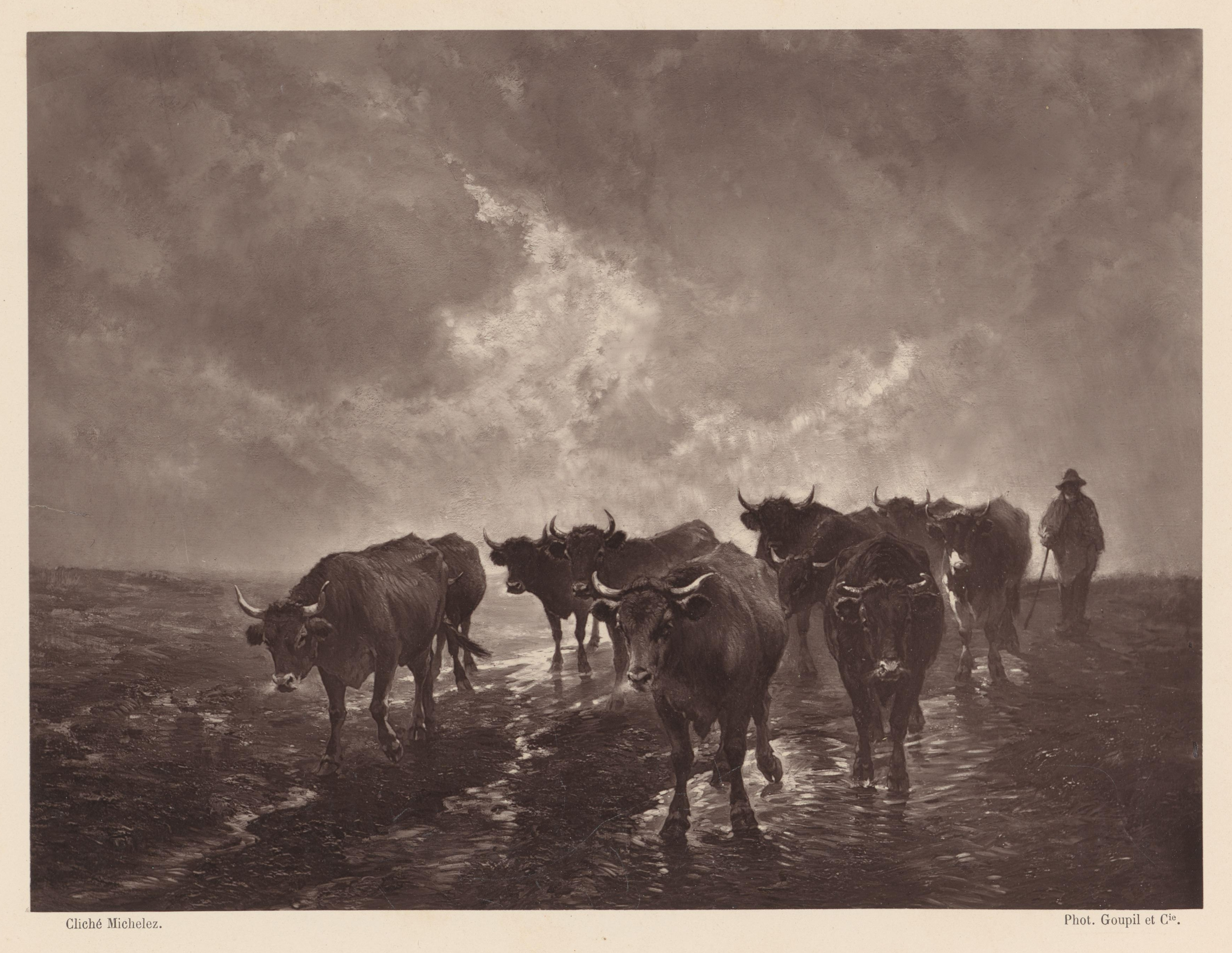
Le retour du troupeau

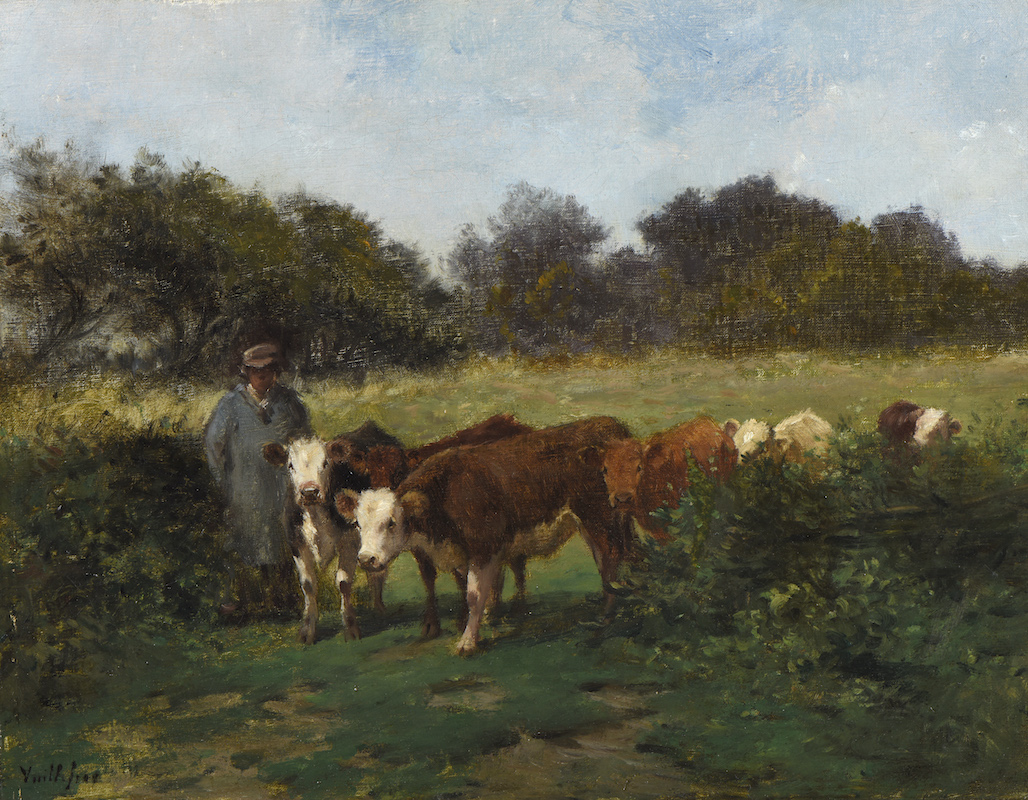
Paysan et ses vaches
