= Gaspard Auguste Brullé =

French entomologist (1809–1873)

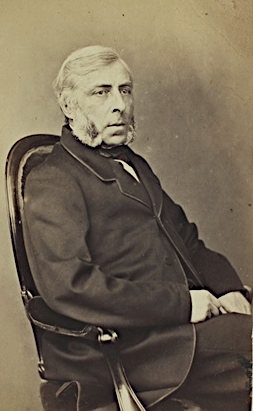
- Brullé, c. 1860
- Born: 7 April 1809
- Died: 21 January 1873 (aged 63)
- Citizenship: France
- Scientific career
- Fields: Entomology
- Thesis: Sur quelques points de la méthode en histoire naturelle, et en particulier sur les limites du genre et de l'espèce (1839)

Gaspard Auguste Brullé (7 April 1809 – 21 January 1873) was a French entomologist.

Passionate about insects from a young age and through the intervention of Georges Cuvier, Brullé participated in the Morea expedition, organised by Jean Baptiste Bory de Saint-Vincent, in 1829.

In 1832, Brullé participated in the foundation of the Société entomologique de France. The following year, he became an aide-naturaliste (assistant naturalist) to Jean Victoire Audouin in charge of Crustacea, Arachnida and insects.

Brullé studied for and obtained a baccalauréat in sciences then in "lettres", before qualifying in 1839 as a Doctor of Natural Science. His thesis, published in 1837, was Sur le gisement des insectes fossiles et sur les services que l'étude de ces animaux peut fournir à la géologie. He became the Professor of Zoology and Comparative Anatomy at the University of Dijon.

Brullé proposed a new classification of Neuroptera which was completed by Wilhelm Ferdinand Erichson. He also wrote the introduction, parts of the text of Histoire naturelle des insectes coléoptères (published in 1840) with Francis de Laporte de Castelnau and parts of Histoire naturelle des insectes. Hyménoptères with Amédée Louis Michel le Peletier, comte de Saint-Fargeau.

Étienne Mulsant named the ladybird beetle species Scymnus brullei in his honor

== See also ==
- European and American voyages of scientific exploration
- Category:Taxa named by Gaspard Auguste Brullé
