= Thomas Vernon Wollaston =

English entomologist and malacologist

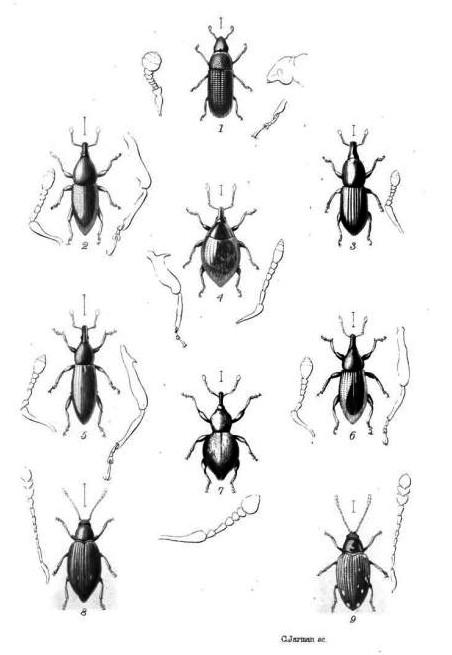
Plate from Wollaston's Coleoptera Sanctæ-Helenæ (1877)

Thomas Vernon Wollaston FLS (9 March 1822 – 4 January 1878) was an English entomologist and malacologist, becoming especially known for his studies of Coleoptera inhabiting several North Atlantic archipelagos. He was well-placed socially. His religious beliefs effectively prevented him from supporting Charles Darwin's theories after 1859, but Darwin remained a close friend. Wollaston supported the theory that continental lands had once extended outward farther to encompass some of the island groups he studied.

== Life ==
Thomas Vernon Wollaston was born in Scotter, Lincolnshire, England, in 1822. In 1845 he gained a B.A. degree from Jesus College, Cambridge, and in 1847 he was made a fellow of the Linnean Society.

Wollaston spent the winter of 1847–1848 in Madeira, returning for his Cambridge M.A. graduation in 1849. In the years to 1855 he made four long trips to Madeira.

In 1857 Wollaston returned to the North Atlantic islands, investigating the natural history of the Canary Islands – with Richard Thomas Lowe and John Edward Gray in 1858, returning with Lowe alone in 1859. After a long and rather mysterious absence he returned to the islands in 1866, this time to Cape Verde Islands with Lowe and Gray. Wollaston was a frequent correspondent with the geologist Charles Lyell and their letters are in the Centre for Research Collections, Edinburgh University Library. Wollaston was also a friendly correspondent with Charles Darwin until 1860. His last trip was to St. Helena with his wife, and Gray.

In 1869, Wollaston married Edith, the youngest daughter of his friend Joseph Shepherd. Following their visit to St. Helena she wrote "Notes on the Lepidoptera of St. Helena, with Descriptions of new Species" which included 37 new species attributed to her. In 1873, Wollaston identified the Brachytemnus beetle.

Wollaston died at Teignmouth, Devon, England, in 1878.

His principal collection of Madeiran Coleoptera was purchased by the then Oxford University Museum (now Oxford University Museum of Natural History) whilst the British Museum purchased his principal collection of Canarian Coleoptera. They are now in the Natural History Museum. Both museums contain duplicate specimens from respective secondary collections. Material can also be found Cambridge University Museum of Zoology, Muséum National d’Histoire Naturelle, Paris, and California Academy of Sciences, San Francisco.

== Selected works ==
- Insecta Maderensia (1854)
- On the Variation of Species, with Especial Reference to the Insecta (1856)
- Coleoptera Atlantidum (1865)
- Coleoptera Sanctæ-Helenæ (1877)
- Testacea Atlantica, or the land and freshwater shells of the Azores, Madeira, Salvages, Canaries, Cape Verdes, and Saint Helena (1878)

Wollaston also wrote many short, and some lengthy, papers on North Atlantic archipelago Coleoptera. A paper attributed to Wollaston on the Diptera of Madeira was almost certainly written by Alexander Henry Haliday.
