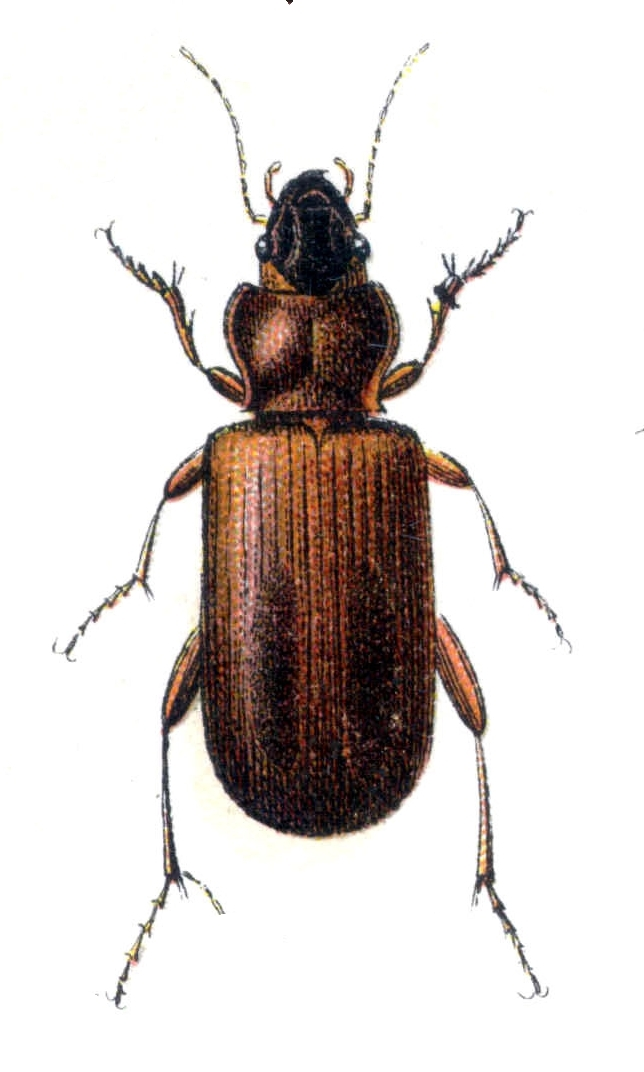
- Trechus micros

Scientific classification
- Kingdom: Animalia
- Phylum: Arthropoda
- Clade: Pancrustacea
- Class: Insecta
- Order: Coleoptera
- Suborder: Adephaga
- Family: Carabidae
- Subfamily: Trechinae
- Genus: Trechus; Clairville, 1806

Subgenera
- Arabotrechus Mateu, 1990; Atlantotrechus Lompe, 1999; Elgonophyes Jeannel, 1954; Elgonotrechus Jeannel, 1954; Meruitrechus Jeannel, 1960; Microtrechus Jeannel, 1927; Setitrechus Deuve, 2005; Trechus Clairville, 1806

Diversity
- At least 1000 species

Synonyms
- Antoinella

= Trechus =

Genus of beetles

Trechus is a genus of ground beetle found in the Palearctic (including Europe), the Near East, and the highlands of East Africa. There are more than 1,000 described species in Trechus.

The name of the genus is derived from the Greek word trécho, meaning "I run".

See List of Trechus species for the species in the genus Trechus.
