= Trechus ogouzicus =

Scientific classification
- Domain: Eukaryota
- Kingdom: Animalia
- Phylum: Arthropoda
- Class: Insecta
- Order: Coleoptera
- Suborder: Adephaga
- Family: Carabidae
- Genus: Trechus
- Species: T. ogouzicus

Binomial name
- Trechus ogouzicus Deuve & Queinnec, 1992

Species of beetle

Trechus ogouzicus is a species of ground beetle in the subfamily Trechinae. It was described by Deuve & Queinnec in 1992.
