= Trechus kurbatovi =

Scientific classification
- Domain: Eukaryota
- Kingdom: Animalia
- Phylum: Arthropoda
- Class: Insecta
- Order: Coleoptera
- Suborder: Adephaga
- Family: Carabidae
- Genus: Trechus
- Species: T. kurbatovi

Binomial name
- Trechus kurbatovi Belousov & Kabak, 2000

Species of beetle

Trechus kurbatovi is a species of ground beetle in the subfamily Trechinae. It was described by Belousov & Kabak in 2000.
