= Trechus valikhanovi =

Scientific classification
- Domain: Eukaryota
- Kingdom: Animalia
- Phylum: Arthropoda
- Class: Insecta
- Order: Coleoptera
- Suborder: Adephaga
- Family: Carabidae
- Genus: Trechus
- Species: T. valikhanovi

Binomial name
- Trechus valikhanovi Belousov & Kabak, 1993

Species of beetle

Trechus valikhanovi is a species of ground beetle in the subfamily Trechinae. It was described by Belousov & Kabak in 1993.
