= Trechus angusticollis =

Scientific classification
- Domain: Eukaryota
- Kingdom: Animalia
- Phylum: Arthropoda
- Class: Insecta
- Order: Coleoptera
- Suborder: Adephaga
- Family: Carabidae
- Genus: Trechus
- Species: T. angusticollis

Binomial name
- Trechus angusticollis Kiesenwetter, 1850

Species of beetle

Trechus angusticollis is a species of ground beetle in the subfamily Trechinae. It was described by Kiesenwetter in 1850.
