= Trechus puetzi =

Scientific classification
- Domain: Eukaryota
- Kingdom: Animalia
- Phylum: Arthropoda
- Class: Insecta
- Order: Coleoptera
- Suborder: Adephaga
- Family: Carabidae
- Genus: Trechus
- Species: T. puetzi

Binomial name
- Trechus puetzi P. Moravec & Wrase, 1998

Species of beetle

Trechus puetzi is a species of beetle in the subfamily Trechinae. It was described by P. Moravec & Wrase in 1998.
