= Trechus barbaritae =

Scientific classification
- Domain: Eukaryota
- Kingdom: Animalia
- Phylum: Arthropoda
- Class: Insecta
- Order: Coleoptera
- Suborder: Adephaga
- Family: Carabidae
- Subfamily: Trechinae
- Genus: Trechus
- Species: T. barbaritae

Binomial name
- Trechus barbaritae Donabauer, 2004

Species of beetle

Trechus barbaritae is a species in the beetle family Carabidae. It is found in Turkey.
