= Trechus gagrensis =

Scientific classification
- Domain: Eukaryota
- Kingdom: Animalia
- Phylum: Arthropoda
- Class: Insecta
- Order: Coleoptera
- Suborder: Adephaga
- Family: Carabidae
- Genus: Trechus
- Species: T. gagrensis

Binomial name
- Trechus gagrensis Jeannel, 1927

Species of beetle

Trechus gagrensis is a species of ground beetle in the subfamily Trechinae. It was described by Jeannel in 1927.
