= Trechus putzeysi =

Scientific classification
- Domain: Eukaryota
- Kingdom: Animalia
- Phylum: Arthropoda
- Class: Insecta
- Order: Coleoptera
- Suborder: Adephaga
- Family: Carabidae
- Genus: Trechus
- Species: T. putzeysi

Binomial name
- Trechus putzeysi Pandelle, 1867

Species of beetle

Trechus putzeysi is a species of ground beetle in the subfamily Trechinae. It was described by Pandelle in 1867.
