= Trechus agni =

Scientific classification
- Domain: Eukaryota
- Kingdom: Animalia
- Phylum: Arthropoda
- Class: Insecta
- Order: Coleoptera
- Suborder: Adephaga
- Family: Carabidae
- Genus: Trechus
- Species: T. agni

Binomial name
- Trechus agni Deuve & Quinnec, 1985

Species of beetle

Trechus agni is a species of ground beetle in the subfamily Trechinae. It was described by Deuve & Quinnec in 1985.
