= Trechus hauseri =

Scientific classification
- Kingdom: Animalia
- Phylum: Arthropoda
- Clade: Pancrustacea
- Class: Insecta
- Order: Coleoptera
- Suborder: Adephaga
- Family: Carabidae
- Genus: Trechus
- Species: T. hauseri

Binomial name
- Trechus hauseri Jeannel, 1962

Species of beetle

Trechus hauseri is a species of ground beetle in the subfamily Trechinae. It was described by Jeannel in 1962.
