= Trechus abeillei =

Scientific classification
- Domain: Eukaryota
- Kingdom: Animalia
- Phylum: Arthropoda
- Class: Insecta
- Order: Coleoptera
- Suborder: Adephaga
- Family: Carabidae
- Genus: Trechus
- Species: T. abeillei

Binomial name
- Trechus abeillei Pandelle, 1872

Species of beetle

Trechus abeillei is a species of ground beetle in the subfamily Trechinae. It was described by Pandelle in 1872.
