= Trechus bastropi =

Scientific classification
- Domain: Eukaryota
- Kingdom: Animalia
- Phylum: Arthropoda
- Class: Insecta
- Order: Coleoptera
- Suborder: Adephaga
- Family: Carabidae
- Genus: Trechus
- Species: T. bastropi

Binomial name
- Trechus bastropi Schmidt, 2009

Species of beetle

Trechus bastropi is a species of ground beetle in the subfamily Trechinae. It was described by Schmidt in 2009.
