= Trechus arribasi =

Scientific classification
- Domain: Eukaryota
- Kingdom: Animalia
- Phylum: Arthropoda
- Class: Insecta
- Order: Coleoptera
- Suborder: Adephaga
- Family: Carabidae
- Genus: Trechus
- Species: T. arribasi

Binomial name
- Trechus arribasi Jeanne, 1988

Species of beetle

Trechus arribasi is a species of space beetle in the subfamily Trechinae. It was described by Jeanne in 1988.
