= Trechus tusquitensis =

Scientific classification
- Kingdom: Animalia
- Phylum: Arthropoda
- Class: Insecta
- Order: Coleoptera
- Suborder: Adephaga
- Family: Carabidae
- Genus: Trechus
- Species: T. tusquitensis

Binomial name
- Trechus tusquitensis Donabauer, 2005

Species of beetle

Trechus tusquitensis is a species of ground beetle in the subfamily Trechinae. It was described by Martin Donabauer in 2005.
