= Trechus ovipennis =

Scientific classification
- Kingdom: Animalia
- Phylum: Arthropoda
- Class: Insecta
- Order: Coleoptera
- Suborder: Adephaga
- Family: Carabidae
- Genus: Trechus
- Species: T. ovipennis

Binomial name
- Trechus ovipennis Motschulsky, 1845

Species of beetle

Trechus ovipennis is a species of ground beetle in the subfamily Trechinae. It was described by Victor Motschulsky in 1845.
