= Trechus scotti =

Scientific classification
- Domain: Eukaryota
- Kingdom: Animalia
- Phylum: Arthropoda
- Class: Insecta
- Order: Coleoptera
- Suborder: Adephaga
- Family: Carabidae
- Genus: Trechus
- Species: T. scotti

Binomial name
- Trechus scotti Jeannel, 1936

Species of beetle

Trechus scotti is a species of ground beetle in the subfamily Trechinae. It was described by Jeannel in 1936.
