= Trechus lallemantii =

Scientific classification
- Kingdom: Animalia
- Phylum: Arthropoda
- Class: Insecta
- Order: Coleoptera
- Suborder: Adephaga
- Family: Carabidae
- Genus: Trechus
- Species: T. lallemantii

Binomial name
- Trechus lallemantii Fairmaire, 1859

Species of beetle

Trechus lallemantii is a species of ground beetle in the subfamily Trechinae. It was described by Fairmaire in 1859.
