= Pterolophia kyushuensis =

Scientific classification
- Domain: Eukaryota
- Kingdom: Animalia
- Phylum: Arthropoda
- Class: Insecta
- Order: Coleoptera
- Suborder: Polyphaga
- Infraorder: Cucujiformia
- Family: Cerambycidae
- Tribe: Pteropliini
- Genus: Pterolophia
- Species: P. kyushuensis

Binomial name
- Pterolophia kyushuensis Takakuwa, 1988

Synonyms
- Pseudale kyushuensis Takakuwa, 1988

Species of beetle

Pterolophia kyushuensis is a species of beetle in the family Cerambycidae. It was described by Takakuwa in 1988.
