= Pterolophia villosa =

Scientific classification
- Domain: Eukaryota
- Kingdom: Animalia
- Phylum: Arthropoda
- Class: Insecta
- Order: Coleoptera
- Suborder: Polyphaga
- Infraorder: Cucujiformia
- Family: Cerambycidae
- Tribe: Pteropliini
- Genus: Pterolophia
- Species: P. villosa

Binomial name
- Pterolophia villosa (Pascoe, 1866)

Synonyms
- Pterolophia (Villosopraonetha) villosa (Pascoe, 1866)

Species of beetle

Pterolophia villosa is a species of beetle in the family Cerambycidae. It was described by Francis Polkinghorne Pascoe in 1866.
