= Pterolophia leiopodina =

Scientific classification
- Kingdom: Animalia
- Phylum: Arthropoda
- Clade: Pancrustacea
- Class: Insecta
- Order: Coleoptera
- Suborder: Polyphaga
- Infraorder: Cucujiformia
- Family: Cerambycidae
- Genus: Pterolophia
- Species: P. leiopodina

Binomial name
- Pterolophia leiopodina (Bates, 1873)

Species of beetle

Pterolophia leiopodina is a species of beetle in the family Cerambycidae. It was described by Henry Walter Bates in 1873.

== Subspecies ==
- Pterolophia leiopodina oshimanensis Breuning, 1969
- Pterolophia leiopodina leiopodina (Bates, 1873)
