= Pterolophia preapicecarinata =

Scientific classification
- Kingdom: Animalia
- Phylum: Arthropoda
- Clade: Pancrustacea
- Class: Insecta
- Order: Coleoptera
- Suborder: Polyphaga
- Infraorder: Cucujiformia
- Family: Cerambycidae
- Genus: Pterolophia
- Species: P. preapicecarinata

Binomial name
- Pterolophia preapicecarinata Breuning, 1969

Species of beetle

Pterolophia preapicecarinata is a species of beetle in the family Cerambycidae, the tribe Pteropliini and the genus Pterolophia. It was described by Stephan von Breuning in 1969 from an original specimen from Nkolkoumou, Cameroon.
