= Pterolophia caballina =

Scientific classification
- Domain: Eukaryota
- Kingdom: Animalia
- Phylum: Arthropoda
- Class: Insecta
- Order: Coleoptera
- Suborder: Polyphaga
- Infraorder: Cucujiformia
- Family: Cerambycidae
- Tribe: Pteropliini
- Genus: Pterolophia
- Species: P. caballina

Binomial name
- Pterolophia caballina (Gressitt, 1951)

Synonyms
- Pterolophia calallina (Gressitt, 1951); Lychrosis caballinus Gressitt, 1951

Species of beetle

Pterolophia caballina is a species of beetle in the family Cerambycidae. It was described by Gressitt in 1951, originally under the genus Lychrosis.
