= Pterolophia niasana =

Scientific classification
- Kingdom: Animalia
- Phylum: Arthropoda
- Clade: Pancrustacea
- Class: Insecta
- Order: Coleoptera
- Suborder: Polyphaga
- Infraorder: Cucujiformia
- Family: Cerambycidae
- Genus: Pterolophia
- Species: P. niasana

Binomial name
- Pterolophia niasana Breuning, 1938

Synonyms
- Pterolophia (Ale) niasana Breuning, 1938

Species of beetle

Pterolophia niasana is a species of beetle in the family Cerambycidae. It was described by Stephan von Breuning in 1938.

== Subspecies ==
- Pterolophia niasana niasana Breuning, 1938
- Pterolophia niasana mentaweiana Breuning, 1969
