= Pterolophia fuscolineata =

Scientific classification
- Kingdom: Animalia
- Phylum: Arthropoda
- Class: Insecta
- Order: Coleoptera
- Suborder: Polyphaga
- Infraorder: Cucujiformia
- Family: Cerambycidae
- Genus: Pterolophia
- Species: P. fuscolineata

Binomial name
- Pterolophia fuscolineata Breuning, 1938

Species of beetle

Pterolophia fuscolineata is a species of beetle in the family Cerambycidae. It was described by Stephan von Breuning in 1938.
