= Pterolophia speciosa =

Scientific classification
- Kingdom: Animalia
- Phylum: Arthropoda
- Class: Insecta
- Order: Coleoptera
- Suborder: Polyphaga
- Infraorder: Cucujiformia
- Family: Cerambycidae
- Genus: Pterolophia
- Species: P. speciosa

Binomial name
- Pterolophia speciosa Breuning

Species of beetle

Pterolophia speciosa is a species of beetle in the family Cerambycidae. It was described by Stephan von Breuning.
