= Pterolophia denticollis =

Scientific classification
- Kingdom: Animalia
- Phylum: Arthropoda
- Clade: Pancrustacea
- Class: Insecta
- Order: Coleoptera
- Suborder: Polyphaga
- Infraorder: Cucujiformia
- Family: Cerambycidae
- Genus: Pterolophia
- Species: P. denticollis

Binomial name
- Pterolophia denticollis (Jordan, 1894)

Species of beetle

Pterolophia denticollis is a species of beetle in the family Cerambycidae. It was described by Karl Jordan in 1894.
