= Pterolophia spinifera =

Scientific classification
- Kingdom: Animalia
- Phylum: Arthropoda
- Clade: Pancrustacea
- Class: Insecta
- Order: Coleoptera
- Suborder: Polyphaga
- Infraorder: Cucujiformia
- Family: Cerambycidae
- Genus: Pterolophia
- Species: P. spinifera

Binomial name
- Pterolophia spinifera (Quedenfeldt, 1888)

Synonyms
- Acroptycha spinifera Quedenfeldt, 1888

Species of beetle

Pterolophia spinifera is a species of beetle in the family Cerambycidae. It was described by Quedenfeldt in 1888.
