= Pterolophia castaneivora =

Scientific classification
- Kingdom: Animalia
- Phylum: Arthropoda
- Clade: Pancrustacea
- Class: Insecta
- Order: Coleoptera
- Suborder: Polyphaga
- Infraorder: Cucujiformia
- Family: Cerambycidae
- Genus: Pterolophia
- Species: P. castaneivora

Binomial name
- Pterolophia castaneivora Ohbayashi & Hayashi, 1962

Species of beetle

Pterolophia castaneivora is a species of beetle in the family Cerambycidae. It was described by Ohbayashi and Masao Hayashi in 1962. It is known from South Korea and Japan.
