= Pterolophia penicillata =

Scientific classification
- Kingdom: Animalia
- Phylum: Arthropoda
- Clade: Pancrustacea
- Class: Insecta
- Order: Coleoptera
- Suborder: Polyphaga
- Infraorder: Cucujiformia
- Family: Cerambycidae
- Genus: Pterolophia
- Species: P. penicillata

Binomial name
- Pterolophia penicillata (Pascoe, 1862)

Synonyms
- Pterolophia tonkinea Pic, 1926; Praonetha penicillata Pascoe, 1862

Species of beetle

Pterolophia penicillata is a species of beetle in the family Cerambycidae. It was described by Francis Polkinghorne Pascoe in 1862, originally under the genus Praonetha.
