= Pterolophia strumosa =

Scientific classification
- Kingdom: Animalia
- Phylum: Arthropoda
- Clade: Pancrustacea
- Class: Insecta
- Order: Coleoptera
- Suborder: Polyphaga
- Infraorder: Cucujiformia
- Family: Cerambycidae
- Genus: Pterolophia
- Species: P. strumosa

Binomial name
- Pterolophia strumosa (Pascoe, 1865)

Synonyms
- Pterolophia pleuricausta (Pascoe, 1866); Pterolophia (Ale) strumosa (Pascoe, 1865); Praonetha palliata Pascoe, 1865; Praonetha frustrata Pascoe, 1865; Praonetha bimaculata Blackburn, 1895; Praonetha strumosa Pascoe, 1865; Praonetha pleuricausta Pascoe, 1866

Species of beetle

Pterolophia strumosa is a species of beetle in the family Cerambycidae. It was described by Francis Polkinghorne Pascoe in 1865, originally under the genus Praonetha. It is known from Australia. It contains the varietas Pterolophia strumosa var. blackburni.
