= Pterolophia nitidomaculata =

Scientific classification
- Kingdom: Animalia
- Phylum: Arthropoda
- Clade: Pancrustacea
- Class: Insecta
- Order: Coleoptera
- Suborder: Polyphaga
- Infraorder: Cucujiformia
- Family: Cerambycidae
- Genus: Pterolophia
- Species: P. nitidomaculata

Binomial name
- Pterolophia nitidomaculata (Pic, 1944)

Synonyms
- Ropica nitidomaculata Pic, 1944; Pterolophia (Ale) nitidomaculata (Pic, 1944)

Species of beetle

Pterolophia nitidomaculata is a species of beetle in the family Cerambycidae. It was described by Maurice Pic in 1944.
