= Pterolophia ochreomaculata =

Scientific classification
- Kingdom: Animalia
- Phylum: Arthropoda
- Clade: Pancrustacea
- Class: Insecta
- Order: Coleoptera
- Suborder: Polyphaga
- Infraorder: Cucujiformia
- Family: Cerambycidae
- Genus: Pterolophia
- Species: P. ochreomaculata

Binomial name
- Pterolophia ochreomaculata Breuning, 1940

Synonyms
- Pterolophia (Ale) ochreomaculata Breuning, 1940

Species of beetle

Pterolophia ochreomaculata is a species of beetle in the family Cerambycidae. It was discovered by Stephan von Breuning in 1940.
