= Pterolophia trilineicollis =

Scientific classification
- Kingdom: Animalia
- Phylum: Arthropoda
- Clade: Pancrustacea
- Class: Insecta
- Order: Coleoptera
- Suborder: Polyphaga
- Infraorder: Cucujiformia
- Family: Cerambycidae
- Genus: Pterolophia
- Species: P. trilineicollis

Binomial name
- Pterolophia trilineicollis Gressitt, 1951

Synonyms
- Pterolophia (Hylobrotus) trilineicollis Gressitt, 1951

Species of beetle

Pterolophia trilineicollis is a species of beetle in the family Cerambycidae. It was described by Gressitt in 1951.
