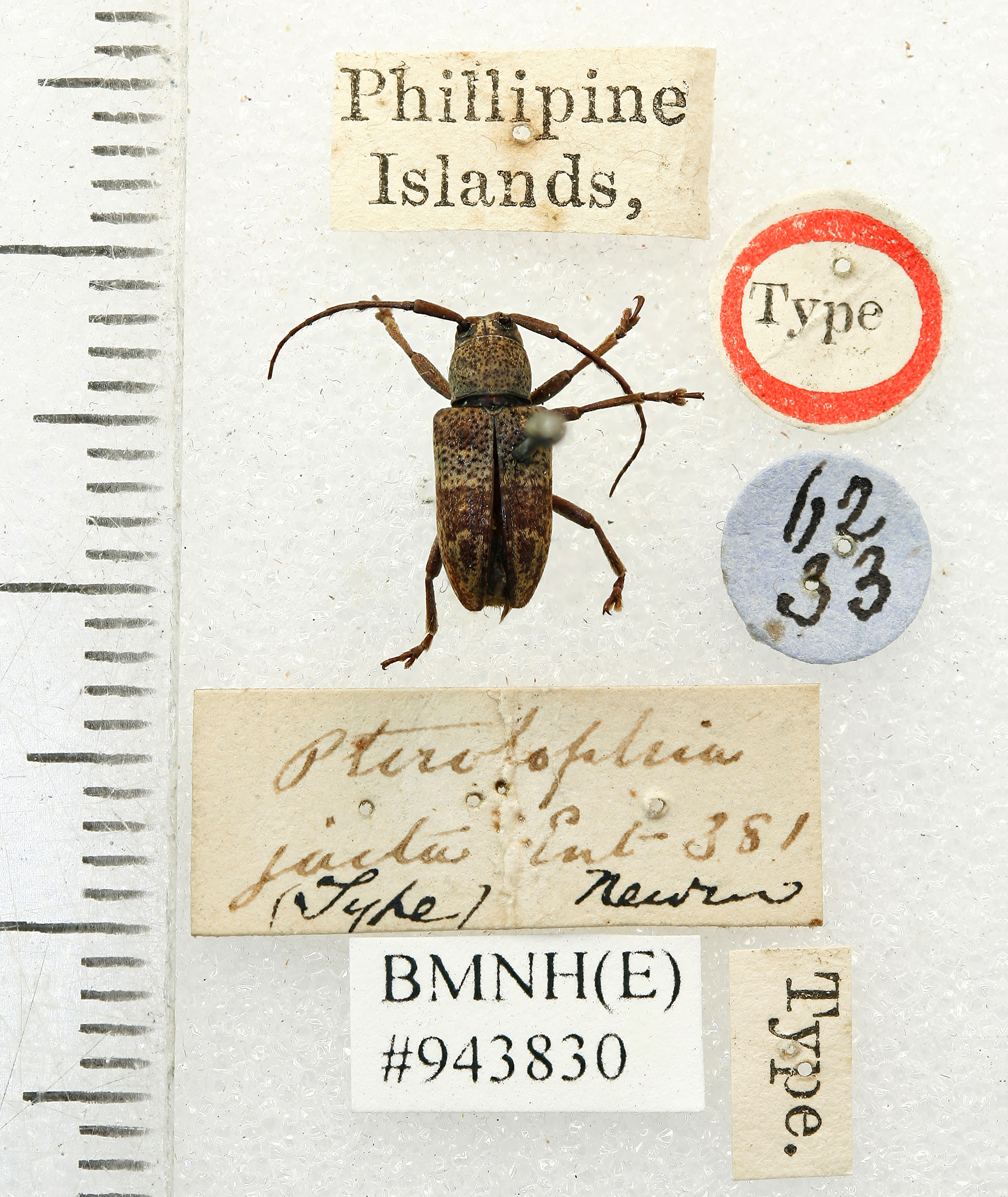
- Pterolophia jacta Newman

Scientific classification
- Kingdom: Animalia
- Phylum: Arthropoda
- Clade: Pancrustacea
- Class: Insecta
- Order: Coleoptera
- Suborder: Polyphaga
- Infraorder: Cucujiformia
- Family: Cerambycidae
- Genus: Pterolophia
- Species: P. jacta

Binomial name
- Pterolophia jacta Newman, 1842

= Pterolophia jacta =

Species of beetle

Pterolophia jacta is a species of beetle in the family Cerambycidae. It was described by Newman in 1842. It is known from the Philippines.
