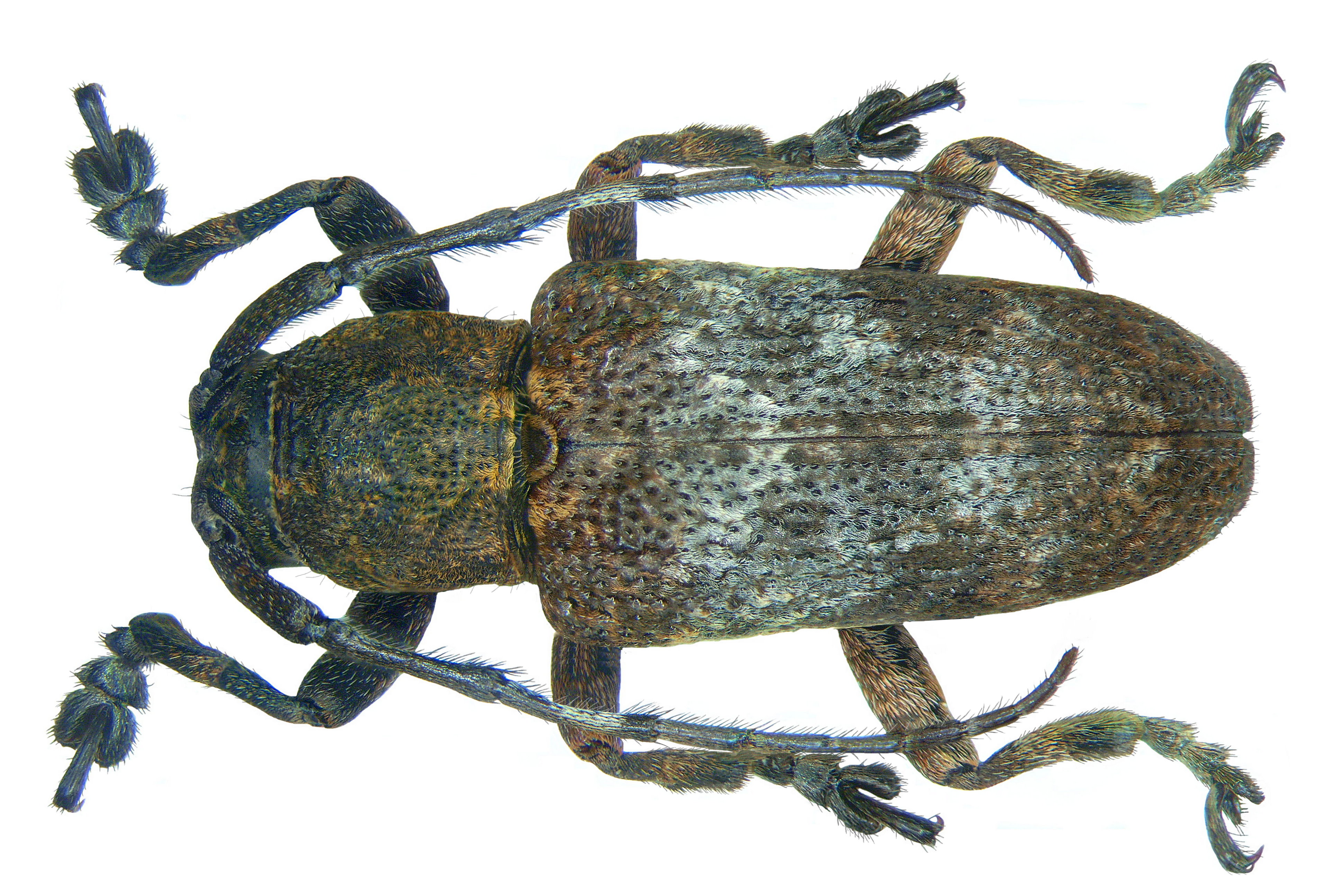
- Pterolophia melanura

Scientific classification
- Kingdom: Animalia
- Phylum: Arthropoda
- Clade: Pancrustacea
- Class: Insecta
- Order: Coleoptera
- Suborder: Polyphaga
- Infraorder: Cucujiformia
- Family: Cerambycidae
- Subfamily: Lamiinae
- Tribe: Pteropliini
- Genus: Pterolophia; Newman, 1842

= Pterolophia =

Genus of beetles

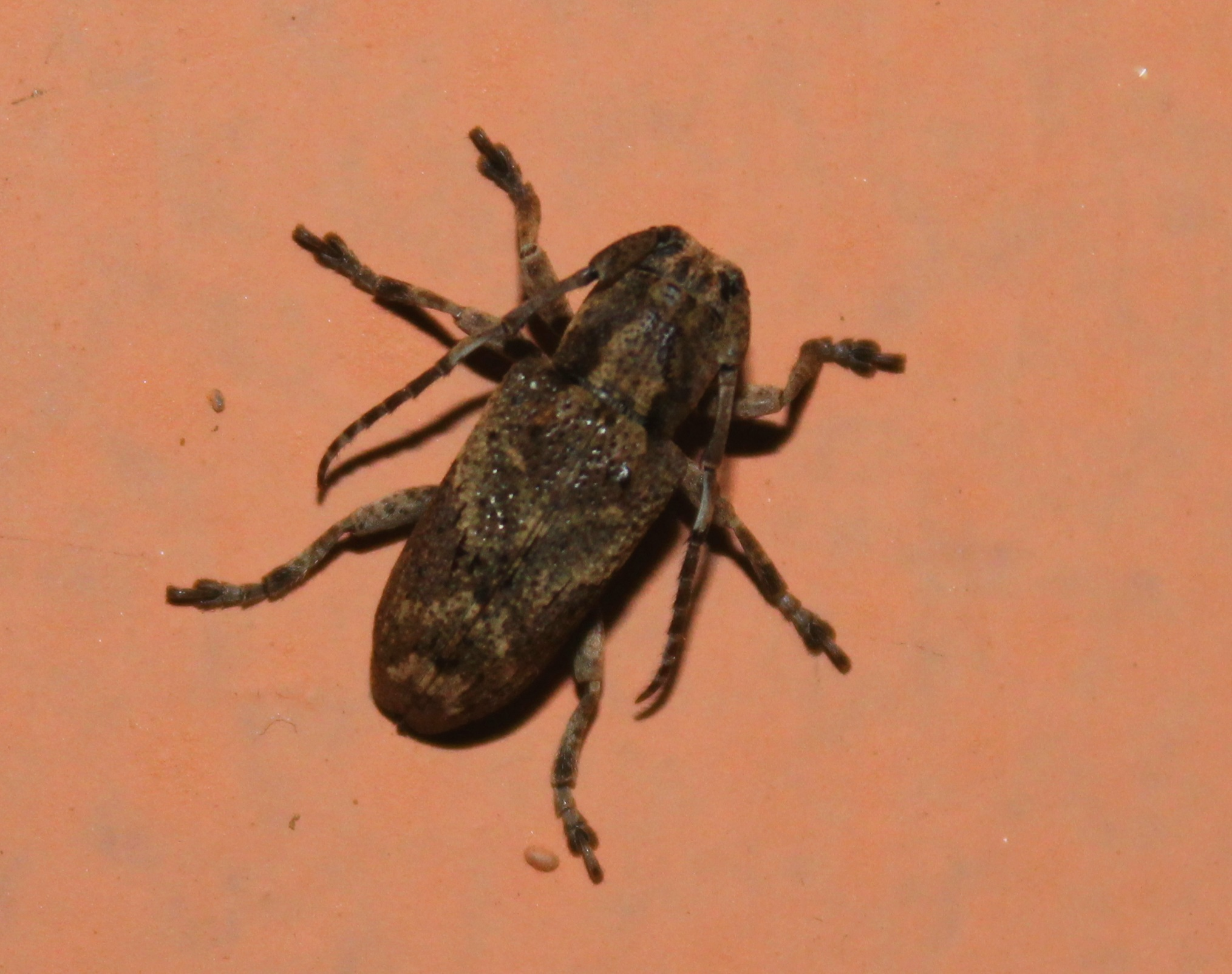
In Sri Lanka

Pterolophia is a genus of longhorn beetles of the subfamily Lamiinae, containing the following species:

subgenus Ale

- Pterolophia affinis Breuning, 1938
- Pterolophia agraria (Pascoe, 1865)
- Pterolophia albescens Breuning, 1938
- Pterolophia albicans Breuning, 1938
- Pterolophia albohumeralis Breuning, 1961
- Pterolophia albotarsalis Breuning, 1938
- Pterolophia albovaria Breuning, 1938
- Pterolophia albovittata Breuning, 1938
- Pterolophia annamensis Breuning, 1939
- Pterolophia annularis Breuning, 1938
- Pterolophia anoplagiata Aurivillius, 1911
- Pterolophia apicefasciata Breuning, 1938
- Pterolophia arrowiana Breuning, 1938
- Pterolophia assamana Breuning, 1968
- Pterolophia australica Breuning, 1938
- Pterolophia baliana Breuning, 1980
- Pterolophia bangi Pic, 1937
- Pterolophia basalis (Pascoe, 1875)
- Pterolophia basicristata Breuning, 1938
- Pterolophia basiflavipennis Breuning, 1970 inq.
- Pterolophia bicostata Breuning, 1943
- Pterolophia bicristulata Breuning, 1940
- Pterolophia bilatevittata Breuning, 1942
- Pterolophia binaluana Breuning, 1938
- Pterolophia binhana Pic, 1926
- Pterolophia biplagiaticollis Breuning, 1961 inq.
- Pterolophia bispinosa Breuning, 1938
- Pterolophia bizonata MacLeay, 1886
- Pterolophia blairiella Breuning, 1938
- Pterolophia brunnea Breuning, 1938
- Pterolophia brunnescens Breuning, 1938
- Pterolophia camela Pic, 1926
- Pterolophia chekiangensis Gressitt, 1942
- Pterolophia coenosa Matsushita, 1953
- Pterolophia concreta (Pascoe, 1865)
- Pterolophia conformis (Pascoe, 1865)
- Pterolophia costalis (Pascoe, 1862)
- Pterolophia coxalis Breuning, 1943
- Pterolophia crenatocristata Breuning, 1938
- Pterolophia cylindricollis Gressitt, 1942
- Pterolophia declivis Breuning, 1938
- Pterolophia deformis Breuning, 1939
- Pterolophia duplicata (Pascoe, 1865)
- Pterolophia egumensis Breuning, 1973
- Pterolophia ephippiata (Pascoe, 1865)
- Pterolophia everetti Breuning, 1966
- Pterolophia excavata Breuning, 1938
- Pterolophia excisa Breuning, 1938
- Pterolophia exigua Breuning, 1938
- Pterolophia finitima Breuning, 1943
- Pterolophia flavopicta Breuning, 1938
- Pterolophia forbesi Breuning, 1966
- Pterolophia fractilinea (Pascoe, 1865)
- Pterolophia fulva Breuning, 1938
- Pterolophia fulvobasalis Breuning & de Jong, 1941
- Pterolophia funebris Breuning, 1938
- Pterolophia fuscoplagiata Breuning, 1938
- Pterolophia fuscostictica Breuning, 1938
- Pterolophia gardneriana Breuning, 1938
- Pterolophia geelwinkiana Breuning, 1938
- Pterolophia gibbosipennis Pic, 1926
- Pterolophia gigas Pic, 1937
- Pterolophia gregalis Fisher, 1927
- Pterolophia griseovaria Breuning, 1938
- Pterolophia grossepunctata Breuning, 1938
- Pterolophia hebridarum Breuning, 1938
- Pterolophia hirsuta Breuning, 1943
- Pterolophia honesta Breuning, 1938
- Pterolophia hybrida Newman, 1842
- Pterolophia idionea Fisher, 1927
- Pterolophia idoneoides Breuning, 1980
- Pterolophia indistincta Breuning, 1938
- Pterolophia infirmior Breuning, 1938
- Pterolophia jeanvoinei Pic, 1929
- Pterolophia jugosa Bates, 1873
- Pterolophia kaszabi Breuning, 1954
- Pterolophia keyana Breuning, 1939
- Pterolophia lateraliplagiata Breuning, 1938
- Pterolophia lineatipennis Breuning, 1974
- Pterolophia longula Breuning, 1938
- Pterolophia longulipennis Breuning, 1961
- Pterolophia loochooana Matsushita, 1953
- Pterolophia lumawigiensis Breuning, 1980
- Pterolophia lundbladi Breuning, 1938
- Pterolophia luzonica Breuning, 1938
- Pterolophia malaisei Breuning, 1949
- Pterolophia marmorata Breuning, 1938
- Pterolophia marmorea Breuning, 1938
- Pterolophia marshalliana Breuning, 1938
- Pterolophia mediochracea Breuning, 1938
- Pterolophia melanura (Pascoe, 1857)
- Pterolophia mindoroensis Breuning, 1943
- Pterolophia modesta (Gahan, 1894)
- Pterolophia neopomeriana Breuning, 1938
- Pterolophia niasana Breuning, 1938
- Pterolophia niasica Breuning, 1938
- Pterolophia nigrita (Pascoe, 1859)
- Pterolophia nigroconjuncta Breuning & de Jong, 1941
- Pterolophia nigrotransversefasciata Breuning, 1982
- Pterolophia nilghirica Breuning, 1938
- Pterolophia nitidomaculata (Pic, 1944)
- Pterolophia obducta (Pascoe, 1865)
- Pterolophia obliqueplagiata Breuning, 1938
- Pterolophia obliquestriata Breuning, 1938
- Pterolophia ochraceopicta Breuning, 1970
- Pterolophia ochreomaculata Breuning, 1940
- Pterolophia ochreostictica Breuning, 1938
- Pterolophia ochreosticticollis Breuning, 1968
- Pterolophia olivacea Breuning & de Jong, 1941
- Pterolophia palauana Matsushita, 1935
- Pterolophia palawanica Breuning, 1938
- Pterolophia pallida (MacLeay, 1886)
- Pterolophia papuana Breuning, 1938
- Pterolophia pascoei Breuning, 1938
- Pterolophia pendleburyi Breuning, 1961
- Pterolophia peraffinis Breuning, 1938
- Pterolophia perakensis Breuning, 1938
- Pterolophia pici Breuning, 1938
- Pterolophia pictula Breuning, 1938
- Pterolophia postscutellaris Breuning, 1967
- Pterolophia proxima (Gahan, 1894)
- Pterolophia pseudobasalis Breuning, 1961
- Pterolophia pseudocostalis Breuning, 1939
- Pterolophia pulchra Aurivillius, 1921
- Pterolophia quadrituberculata Breuning & de Jong, 1941
- Pterolophia queenslandensis Breuning, 1975
- Pterolophia romani Breuning, 1938
- Pterolophia rosacea Breuning, 1938
- Pterolophia rosselli Breuning, 1982
- Pterolophia rubiensis Breuning, 1968
- Pterolophia rufoloides Breuning, 1940
- Pterolophia rufula Breuning, 1938
- Pterolophia rufuloides Breuning, 1940
- Pterolophia saintaignani Breuning, 1982
- Pterolophia salomonum Breuning, 1938
- Pterolophia sanghiriensis Breuning, 1970
- Pterolophia schmidi Breuning, 1967
- Pterolophia shortlandensis Breuning, 1973
- Pterolophia sibuyensis Breuning, 1938
- Pterolophia sikkimensis Breuning, 1938
- Pterolophia simillima Breuning, 1938
- Pterolophia simplicior Breuning, 1961
- Pterolophia sinensis (Fairmaire, 1900)
- Pterolophia spinosa Breuning, 1938
- Pterolophia strandi Breuning, 1938
- Pterolophia strandiella Breuning, 1938
- Pterolophia strumosa (Pascoe, 1865)
- Pterolophia subfasciata (Gahan, 1894)
- Pterolophia subsellata (Pascoe, 1865)
- Pterolophia subsignata Breuning, 1938
- Pterolophia subvillaris Breuning, 1980
- Pterolophia sulcaticornis Breuning & de Jong, 1941
- Pterolophia sulcatithorax Pic, 1926
- Pterolophia sumbawana Breuning, 1947
- Pterolophia ternatensis Breuning, 1938
- Pterolophia theresae (Pic, 1944)
- Pterolophia timorensis Breuning, 1943
- Pterolophia tricolor Breuning, 1938
- Pterolophia tricoloripennis Breuning, 1961
- Pterolophia trobriandensis Breuning, 1970
- Pterolophia tsurugiana (Matsushita, 1934)
- Pterolophia tugelensis Breuning, 1961
- Pterolophia uniformipennis Breuning, 1966
- Pterolophia uniformis (Pascoe, 1865)
- Pterolophia vaga (Gahan, 1894)
- Pterolophia vagestriata Breuning, 1938
- Pterolophia variabilis (Pascoe, 1859)
- Pterolophia villaris (Pascoe, 1865)
- Pterolophia viridegrisea Breuning, 1938
- Pterolophia woodlarkiana Breuning, 1973

subgenus Annobonopraonetha

- Pterolophia annobonae Aurivillius, 1910

subgenus Arabopraonetha

- Pterolophia arabica Teocchi, 1992

subgenus Armatopraonetha

- Pterolophia albopunctulata Breuning, 1969
- Pterolophia armata Gahan, 1894
- Pterolophia bifasciata Breuning, 1968
- Pterolophia borneensis Fisher, 1935
- Pterolophia lumawigiana Breuning, 1980
- Pterolophia malabarica Breuning, 1938
- Pterolophia multisignata Pic, 1934
- Pterolophia ochreopunctata Breuning & de Jong, 1941
- Pterolophia pedongana Breuning, 1982

subgenus Australopraonetha

- Pterolophia australis Breuning, 1957
- Pterolophia colffsi Breuning, 1976

subgenus Canopraonetha

- Pterolophia cana Breuning, 1938

subgenus Chaetostigme

- Pterolophia casta (Pascoe, 1875)
- Pterolophia lychrosoides Breuning, 1961
- Pterolophia metallescens Breuning, 1938
- Pterolophia murina (Pascoe, 1859)
- Pterolophia nivea Breuning, 1938

subgenus Curtolophia

- Pterolophia curticornis Breuning, 1974

subgenus Fernandopraonetha

- Pterolophia tubercullicollis Breuning, 1966

subgenus Gibbopraonetha

- Pterolophia quadrigibbosa Pic, 1926
- Pterolophia quadrigibbosipennis Breuning, 1968

subgenus Guineopraonetha

- Pterolophia aeneipennis Breuning & Heyrovsky, 1964

subgenus Hylobrothus

- Pterolophia aequabilis Breuning, 1938
- Pterolophia albanina Gressitt, 1942
- Pterolophia albertisi Breuning, 1939
- Pterolophia albivenosa (Pascoe, 1865)
- Pterolophia albonigra Gressitt, 1940
- Pterolophia annulata (Chevrolat, 1845)
- Pterolophia antennata Breuning & de Jong, 1941
- Pterolophia anticemaculata Breuning, 1938
- Pterolophia apicespinosa Breuning, 1938
- Pterolophia arrowi Breuning, 1938
- Pterolophia atrofasciata (Pic, 1925)
- Pterolophia bambusae Breuning, 1938
- Pterolophia beesoni Breuning, 1938
- Pterolophia bicirculata Breuning, 1938
- Pterolophia bicristata Aurivillius, 1927
- Pterolophia biloba Breuning, 1938
- Pterolophia bisulcaticollis Pic, 1926
- Pterolophia bituberculata Breuning, 1938
- Pterolophia bituberculatoides Breuning, 1976
- Pterolophia carinata (Gahan, 1894)
- Pterolophia celebensis Breuning, 1938
- Pterolophia chebana (Gahan, 1894)
- Pterolophia cochinchinensis Breuning, 1966
- Pterolophia deducta (Pascoe, 1865)
- Pterolophia devittata Aurivillius, 1927
- Pterolophia discalis Gressitt, 1951
- Pterolophia discaloides Breuning, 1982
- Pterolophia dohrni (Pascoe, 1875)
- Pterolophia fuscobiplagiata Breuning & de Jong, 1941
- Pterolophia gigantea Breuning, 1938
- Pterolophia humerosopunctata Breuning, 1938
- Pterolophia indistinctemaculata Breuning, 1968
- Pterolophia innuganensis Breuning, 1966
- Pterolophia inplagiata Breuning, 1980
- Pterolophia javana Breuning, 1938
- Pterolophia laosensis Pic, 1926
- Pterolophia latefascia Schwarzer, 1925
- Pterolophia lateralis Gahan, 1895
- Pterolophia lumawigi Breuning, 1980
- Pterolophia mediocarinata Breuning, 1939
- Pterolophia mediomaculata Breuning, 1940
- Pterolophia misella Breuning, 1938
- Pterolophia moupinensis Breuning, 1973
- Pterolophia multicarinatoides Breuning, 1974
- Pterolophia multigibbulosa Pic, 1937
- Pterolophia nicobarica Breuning, 1938
- Pterolophia nigrofasciata Breuning, 1938
- Pterolophia obscuroides Breuning, 1938
- Pterolophia ochreosignata Breuning, 1974
- Pterolophia ochreotriangularis Breuning, 1958
- Pterolophia ochreotriangularoices Breuning, 1977
- Pterolophia oculata Breuning, 1938
- Pterolophia paracompacta Breuning, 1973
- Pterolophia parobscuroides Breuning, 1973
- Pterolophia partealboantenata Breuning, 1966
- Pterolophia ploemi (Lacordaire, 1872)
- Pterolophia postfasciculata Pic, 1934
- Pterolophia pseudolaosensis Breuning, 1958
- Pterolophia pulla Breuning, 1939
- Pterolophia robusta (Pic, 1928)
- Pterolophia simulata (Gahan, 1907)
- Pterolophia siporensis Breuning, 1939
- Pterolophia sobrina (Pascoe, 1865)
- Pterolophia subcostata Breuning, 1938
- Pterolophia sumatrana Breuning, 1938
- Pterolophia szetschuanensis Breuning, 1973
- Pterolophia tibialis Breuning, 1938
- Pterolophia trilineicollis Gressitt, 1951
- Pterolophia tuberculatrix (Fabricius, 1781)
- Pterolophia yunnanensis Breuning, 1974

subgenus Insularepraonetha

- Pterolophia ferrugineotincta Aurivillius, 1926
- Pterolophia insularis Breuning, 1938
- Pterolophia ochreoscutellaris Báguena & Breuning, 1958

subgenus Lychrosis

- Pterolophia afflicta (Pascoe, 1867)
- Pterolophia bivittata (Aurivillius, 1926)
- Pterolophia caballina (Gressitt, 1951)
- Pterolophia fasciata (Gressitt, 1940)
- Pterolophia humerosa (Thomson, 1865)
- Pterolophia luctuosa (Pascoe, 1863)
- Pterolophia mimica (Gressitt, 1942)
- Pterolophia obscuricolor Breuning, 1943
- Pterolophia quadrilineata (Hope, 1841)
- Pterolophia rufipennis (Pic, 1923)
- Pterolophia subbicolor Breuning, 1960
- Pterolophia variegata (Thomson, 1865)
- Pterolophia varipennis (Thomson, 1865)
- Pterolophia zebrina (Pascoe, 1858)

subgenus Mimoron

- Pterolophia brevegibbosa Pic, 1926
- Pterolophia dalbergicola Gressitt, 1951
- Pterolophia pedongensis Breuning, 1969
- Pterolophia phungi (Pic, 1925)
- Pterolophia ropicoides Breuning, 1968

subgenus Ovalopraonetha

- Pterolophia ovalis Breuning, 1938

subgenus Paramimoron

- Pterolophia albolateralis Breuning, 1938
- Pterolophia nigrocirculata Breuning
- Pterolophia speciosa Breuning
- Pterolophia subropicoides Breuning, 1968

subgenus Pilosipraonetha

- Pterolophia apicefasciculata Breuning, 1943
- Pterolophia beccarii Gahan, 1907
- Pterolophia dohertyana Breuning, 1968
- Pterolophia flavoplagiata Breuning, 1938
- Pterolophia obliquelineata Breuning, 1938
- Pterolophia parapilosipes Breuning, 1980
- Pterolophia parovalis Breuning, 1973
- Pterolophia pilosipes Pic, 1926
- Pterolophia truncatella Breuning, 1943
- Pterolophia tuberosicollis Breuning, 1943

subgenus Principipraonetha

- Pterolophia consimilis Breuning, 1943
- Pterolophia principis Aurivillius, 1910
- Pterolophia pseudoprincipis Breuning, 1943

subgenus Prosplopraonetha

- Pterolophia prosoploides Breuning, 1961

subgenus Pseudale

- Pterolophia adachii (Hayashi, 1983)
- Pterolophia dorsotuberculare Hayashi, 1984
- Pterolophia fasciata (Schwarzer, 1925)
- Pterolophia izumikurana (Hayashi, 1971)
- Pterolophia jiriensis Danilevsky, 1996
- Pterolophia koshikijimana Makihara, 2006
- Pterolophia kyushuensis Takakuwa, 1988
- Pterolophia obovata (Hayashi, 1971)
- Pterolophia oshimana Breuning, 1955
- Pterolophia suginoi Makihara, 1986

subgenus Pterolophia

- Pterolophia aberrans Aurivillius, 1927
- Pterolophia aethiopica Breuning, 1938
- Pterolophia albicollis Breuning, 1972
- Pterolophia alboantennata Breuning, 1938
- Pterolophia albocincta Gahan, 1894
- Pterolophia albomaculata Breuning, 1938
- Pterolophia albomarmorata Breuning, 1938
- Pterolophia alboplagiata Gahan, 1894
- Pterolophia albosignata (Blanchard, 1853)
- Pterolophia albovariegata Breuning, 1938
- Pterolophia albovitticollis Breuning, 1961
- Pterolophia alluaudi Breuning, 1938
- Pterolophia alorensis Breuning, 1958
- Pterolophia alternata Gressitt, 1938
- Pterolophia andamana Breuning, 1974
- Pterolophia andamanensis Breuning, 1938
- Pterolophia andamanica Breuning, 1938
- Pterolophia andrewesi Breuning, 1938
- Pterolophia angulata (Kolbe, 1893)
- Pterolophia angusta (Bates, 1873)
- Pterolophia annulitarsis (Pascoe, 1865)
- Pterolophia apicefusca Breuning, 1938
- Pterolophia apicemaculata Breuning, 1938
- Pterolophia apiceplagiata Breuning, 1938
- Pterolophia approximata Breuning, 1938
- Pterolophia arcuata Breuning, 1938
- Pterolophia ashantica Breuning, 1972
- Pterolophia assamensis Breuning, 1938
- Pterolophia assimilis Breuning, 1938
- Pterolophia assinica Breuning, 1970
- Pterolophia aurivillii Breuning, 1961
- Pterolophia baiensis Pic, 1926
- Pterolophia banksi Breuning, 1938
- Pterolophia barbieri Breuning, 1973
- Pterolophia basilana Breuning, 1938
- Pterolophia basileensis Lepesme & Breuning, 1953
- Pterolophia basilewskyi Breuning, 1968
- Pterolophia basispinosa Breuning, 1938
- Pterolophia bedoci Pic, 1929
- Pterolophia benjamini Breuning, 1938
- Pterolophia biarcuata (Thomson, 1858)
- Pterolophia biarcuatoides Breuning, 1943
- Pterolophia bicarinata Breuning, 1938
- Pterolophia bicoloriantennata Breuning, 1977
- Pterolophia bifuscomaculata Breuning, 1976
- Pterolophia bigibbera (Newman, 1842)
- Pterolophia bigibbicollis Breuning, 1967
- Pterolophia bigibbosa Breuning, 1970
- Pterolophia bigibbulosa (Pic, 1934)
- Pterolophia bigibbulosoides Breuning, 1968
- Pterolophia bilineaticeps Pic, 1926
- Pterolophia bilineaticollis (Pic, 1934)
- Pterolophia bilunata Breuning, 1938
- Pterolophia bimaculata Gahan, 1894
- Pterolophia bimaculaticeps Pic, 1926
- Pterolophia binaluanica Breuning & de Jong, 1941
- Pterolophia biochreovittata Breuning, 1976
- Pterolophia bipartita Pic, 1934
- Pterolophia bipostfasciculata Breuning, 1964
- Pterolophia birmanica Breuning, 1947
- Pterolophia bisbinodula (Quedenfeldt, 1883)
- Pterolophia bituberata Breuning, 1938
- Pterolophia bituberculatithorax Breuning, 1968
- Pterolophia bonthaini Breuning, 1966
- Pterolophia bottangensis Breuning, 1968
- Pterolophia brevicornis Breuning, 1939
- Pterolophia bryanti Breuning, 1938
- Pterolophia buruensis Breuning, 1970
- Pterolophia caffrariae Breuning, 1940
- Pterolophia calceoides Breuning & de Jong, 1941
- Pterolophia cambodgensis Breuning, 1968
- Pterolophia canescens Breuning, 1939
- Pterolophia capensis Breuning, 1938
- Pterolophia capreola (Pascoe, 1865)
- Pterolophia carinipennis Gressitt, 1942
- Pterolophia carinulata Breuning, 1938
- Pterolophia castaneivora Ohbayashi & Hayashi, 1962
- Pterolophia caudata (Bates, 1873)
- Pterolophia ceylonensis Breuning, 1938
- Pterolophia ceylonica Breuning, 1938
- Pterolophia chapaensis Pic, 1929
- Pterolophia chinensis Breuning, 1982
- Pterolophia circulata Schwarzer, 1931
- Pterolophia clarior Breuning, 1970
- Pterolophia colasi Breuning, 1938
- Pterolophia collarti Breuning, 1960
- Pterolophia collartiana Breuning, 1962
- Pterolophia compacta Breuning, 1938
- Pterolophia confusa Breuning, 1938
- Pterolophia conjecta (Pascoe, 1865)
- Pterolophia consularis (Pascoe, 1866)
- Pterolophia convexa Breuning, 1938
- Pterolophia costulata Breuning, 1938
- Pterolophia crassepuncta Breuning, 1938
- Pterolophia crassipes (Wiedemann, 1823)
- Pterolophia curvatocostata Aurivillius, 1927
- Pterolophia dahomeica Breuning, 1970
- Pterolophia dalbergiae Breuning, 1938
- Pterolophia dapensis Pic, 1926
- Pterolophia dayremi Breuning, 1940
- Pterolophia decolorata (Heller, 1924)
- Pterolophia densefasciculata Breuning, 1938
- Pterolophia densepunctata Breuning, 1938
- Pterolophia dentaticornis Pic, 1929
- Pterolophia denticollis (Jordan, 1894)
- Pterolophia dentifera (Olivier, 1795)
- Pterolophia detersa (Pascoe, 1865)
- Pterolophia digesta Newman, 1842
- Pterolophia dorsivaria (Fairmaire, 1850)
- Pterolophia dubiosa Breuning, 1938
- Pterolophia dystasioides Breuning, 1943
- Pterolophia ecaudata Kolbe, 1894
- Pterolophia elegans Breuning, 1938
- Pterolophia elongata Pic, 1934
- Pterolophia elongatissima Breuning, 1938
- Pterolophia elongatula Breuning, 1938
- Pterolophia endroedyi Breuning, 1969
- Pterolophia enganensis (Gahan, 1907)
- Pterolophia eritreensis Breuning, 1958
- Pterolophia externemaculata Breuning, 1938
- Pterolophia fainanensis Pic, 1926
- Pterolophia fascicularis Breuning, 1938
- Pterolophia fasciolata (Fairmaire, 1895)
- Pterolophia ferrugata (Pascoe, 1865)
- Pterolophia ferruginea Breuning, 1938
- Pterolophia flavicollis Breuning, 1977
- Pterolophia flavofasciata Breuning, 1938
- Pterolophia flavolineata Breuning, 1938
- Pterolophia fletcheri Breuning, 1938
- Pterolophia fortescapa Breuning, 1961
- Pterolophia forticornis Breuning, 1938
- Pterolophia francoisi Breuning, 1972
- Pterolophia freyi Breuning, 1953
- Pterolophia fuchsi Breuning, 1970
- Pterolophia fukiena Gressitt, 1940
- Pterolophia fulvescens Breuning, 1938
- Pterolophia fulvisparsa Gahan, 1894
- Pterolophia fusca Breuning, 1969
- Pterolophia fuscoapicata Breuning, 1938
- Pterolophia fuscocinerea Breuning, 1938
- Pterolophia fuscodiscalis Breuning, 1977
- Pterolophia fuscofasciata Breuning, 1938
- Pterolophia fuscomarmorata Breuning, 1977
- Pterolophia fuscoscutellata Breuning, 1938
- Pterolophia fuscosericea Breuning, 1938
- Pterolophia gabonica Breuning, 1938
- Pterolophia gardneri Schwarzer, 1931
- Pterolophia ghanaana Breuning, 1972
- Pterolophia ghanaensis Breuning, 1972
- Pterolophia globosa Breuning, 1939
- Pterolophia graciosa Breuning, 1938
- Pterolophia granulata (Motschulsky, 1866)
- Pterolophia granulosa Breuning, 1938
- Pterolophia griseofasciata Breuning, 1938
- Pterolophia grisescens (Pascoe, 1865)
- Pterolophia grossepuncticollis Breuning, 1974
- Pterolophia grossescapa Breuning, 1938
- Pterolophia guineensis (Thomson, 1864)
- Pterolophia henri-renaudi Breuning, 1962
- Pterolophia holobrunnea Breuning, 1977
- Pterolophia holorufa Breuning, 1969
- Pterolophia holzschuhi Breuning, 1975
- Pterolophia hongkongensis Gressitt, 1942
- Pterolophia horii Breuning & Ohbayashi, 1970
- Pterolophia horrida Breuning, 1938
- Pterolophia horridula Breuning, 1968
- Pterolophia humeralis Breuning, 1940
- Pterolophia illicita (Pascoe, 1865)
- Pterolophia inaequalis (Fabricius, 1801)
- Pterolophia inalbonotata (Pic, 1945)
- Pterolophia incerta Breuning, 1938
- Pterolophia indica Breuning, 1938
- Pterolophia inexpectata Breuning, 1938
- Pterolophia ingrata (Pascoe, 1864)
- Pterolophia instabilis Aurivillius, 1922
- Pterolophia insulana Breuning, 1939
- Pterolophia insulicola Breuning, 1938
- Pterolophia intuberculata Pic, 1930
- Pterolophia iringensis Breuning, 1977
- Pterolophia ivorensis Breuning, 1967
- Pterolophia jacta Newman, 1842
- Pterolophia japonica Breuning, 1939
- Pterolophia javicola Fisher, 1936
- Pterolophia kaleea (Bates, 1866)
- Pterolophia kalisi Breuning, 1968
- Pterolophia kenyana Breuning, 1961
- Pterolophia keyensis Breuning, 1938
- Pterolophia kiangsina Gressitt, 1937
- Pterolophia kilimandjaroensis Breuning, 1970
- Pterolophia kinabaluensis Breuning, 1982
- Pterolophia kusamai Hasegawa & Makihara, 1999
- Pterolophia lama Breuning, 1943
- Pterolophia laterialba (Schwarzer, 1925)
- Pterolophia laterialbipennis Breuning, 1964
- Pterolophia lateripicta (Fairmaire, 1879)
- Pterolophia lateritia Breuning, 1939
- Pterolophia latipennis (Pic, 1938)
- Pterolophia leiopodina (Bates, 1873)
- Pterolophia lemoulti Breuning, 1939
- Pterolophia lepida Breuning, 1938
- Pterolophia lesnei Breuning, 1938
- Pterolophia leucoloma (Castelnau, 1840)
- Pterolophia lichenea Duvivier, 1892
- Pterolophia ligata (Pascoe, 1862)
- Pterolophia lobata Breuning, 1938
- Pterolophia lombokensis Breuning, 1982
- Pterolophia longicornis Breuning, 1975
- Pterolophia longiuscula Breuning, 1938
- Pterolophia lunulata (Hintz, 1919)
- Pterolophia luteomarmorata Breuning, 1938
- Pterolophia luzonicola Breuning, 1938
- Pterolophia m-griseum (Mulsant, 1846)
- Pterolophia maacki Blessig, 1873
- Pterolophia macra Breuning, 1943
- Pterolophia mallicolensis (Breuning, 1948)
- Pterolophia mandshurica Breuning, 1938
- Pterolophia matsushitai Breuning, 1938
- Pterolophia medioalbicollis Breuning, 1965
- Pterolophia mediofasciata Breuning, 1938
- Pterolophia mediofuscipennis Breuning, 1970
- Pterolophia mediophthalma Breuning, 1973
- Pterolophia mediopicta Breuning, 1940
- Pterolophia medioplagiata Breuning, 1938
- Pterolophia mediovittata Breuning & de Jong, 1941
- Pterolophia melanura (Pascoe, 1857)
- Pterolophia meridionalis Breuning, 1938
- Pterolophia microphthalma Breuning, 1961
- Pterolophia mimecyroschema Breuning, 1977
- Pterolophia mindanaonis Breuning, 1943
- Pterolophia minima Breuning, 1938
- Pterolophia ministrata (Pascoe, 1865)
- Pterolophia minor (Duvivier, 1891)
- Pterolophia minuta Breuning, 1938
- Pterolophia minutior Breuning, 1973
- Pterolophia minutissima Pic, 1926
- Pterolophia mispiloides Breuning, 1974
- Pterolophia montium (Hintz, 1919)
- Pterolophia mouhoti Breuning, 1973
- Pterolophia mozambica Breuning, 1971
- Pterolophia mucronata Breuning, 1938
- Pterolophia multicarinata Breuning, 1938
- Pterolophia multicarinipennis Breuning, 1957
- Pterolophia multifasciculata Pic, 1926
- Pterolophia multimaculata Pic, 1934
- Pterolophia multituberculata Breuning, 1970
- Pterolophia multituberculosa Téocchi, 1986
- Pterolophia mutata Breuning, 1943
- Pterolophia nigricans Breuning, 1938
- Pterolophia nigrobiarcuata Breuning, 1938
- Pterolophia nigrodorsalis Breuning & Itzinger, 1943
- Pterolophia nigrofasciculata Breuning, 1938
- Pterolophia nigrolineaticollis Breuning, 1961
- Pterolophia nigromaculipennis Breuning, 1968
- Pterolophia nigroornatipennis Breuning, 1965
- Pterolophia nigropicta Breuning, 1938
- Pterolophia nigroplagiata Breuning, 1938
- Pterolophia nigroscutellata Lepesme, 1953
- Pterolophia nigrosignata Breuning, 1969
- Pterolophia nigrosparsa (Kolbe, 1893)
- Pterolophia nigrovirgulata Breuning, 1939
- Pterolophia nobilis Breuning, 1943
- Pterolophia nodicollis Breuning, 1939
- Pterolophia obliquata Breuning & de Jong, 1941
- Pterolophia obliquealbovittata Breuning, 1977
- Pterolophia obliquefasciculata Breuning & de Jong, 1941
- Pterolophia obliquevittipennis Breuning, 1970
- Pterolophia obscura Schwarzer, 1925
- Pterolophia obscurata Breuning, 1938
- Pterolophia occidentalis Breuning, 1972
- Pterolophia occidentalis Schwarzer, 1931
- Pterolophia ochraceolineata Breuning, 1943
- Pterolophia ochreithorax Breuning, 1965
- Pterolophia ochreovittata Breuning, 1938
- Pterolophia omeishana Gressitt, 1945
- Pterolophia oopsida (Gahan, 1907)
- Pterolophia orientalis Breuning, 1937
- Pterolophia ovatula Breuning, 1939
- Pterolophia ovipennis Breuning, 1938
- Pterolophia pallidifrons Breuning, 1938
- Pterolophia parabaiensis Breuning, 1968
- Pterolophia paraflavescens Breuning, 1977
- Pterolophia paraforticornis Breuning, 1976
- Pterolophia paralatipennis Breuning, 1973
- Pterolophia paramicrophthalma Breuning, 1969
- Pterolophia paramulticarinata Breuning, 1977
- Pterolophia parangolensis Breuning, 1977
- Pterolophia parascripta Breuning, 1969
- Pterolophia paravariolosa Breuning, 1969
- Pterolophia parvula Breuning, 1938
- Pterolophia pasteuri Breuning, 1970
- Pterolophia penicillata (Pascoe, 1862)
- Pterolophia perakana Breuning, 1968
- Pterolophia persimilis Gahan, 1894
- Pterolophia persimiloides Breuning, 1968
- Pterolophia pfanneri Breuning, 1976
- Pterolophia plicata (Kolbe, 1893)
- Pterolophia pluricarinipennis Breuning, 1969
- Pterolophia plurifasciculata Breuning, 1943
- Pterolophia pontianakensis Breuning, 1974
- Pterolophia postbalteata Breuning, 1943
- Pterolophia postflavomaculata Breuning, 1969
- Pterolophia postfuscomaculata Breuning, 1973
- Pterolophia postmedioalba Breuning, 1961
- Pterolophia praeapicemaculata Breuning, 1966
- Pterolophia praeclara Breuning, 1970
- Pterolophia preapicecarinata Breuning, 1969
- Pterolophia propinqua (Pascoe, 1865)
- Pterolophia pseudapicata Breuning, 1961
- Pterolophia pseudobscuroides Breuning, 1938
- Pterolophia pseudocarinata Breuning, 1938
- Pterolophia pseudocaudata Breuning, 1961
- Pterolophia pseudoculata Breuning, 1938
- Pterolophia pseudoculatoides Breuning, 1968
- Pterolophia pseudodapensis Breuning, 1947
- Pterolophia pseudolunigera Breuning, 1938
- Pterolophia pseudomucronata Breuning, 1943
- Pterolophia pseudosecuta Breuning, 1938
- Pterolophia pseudotincta Breuning, 1938
- Pterolophia punctigera (Pascoe, 1865)
- Pterolophia pusilla Breuning, 1938
- Pterolophia pygmaea Breuning, 1938
- Pterolophia quadricristata Breuning, 1938
- Pterolophia quadricristipennis Breuning, 1966
- Pterolophia quadricristulata Breuning, 1942
- Pterolophia quadrifasciata Gahan, 1894
- Pterolophia quadrifasciculata Breuning, 1938
- Pterolophia quadrifasciculatipennis Breuning, 1963
- Pterolophia quadrimaculata Breuning, 1938
- Pterolophia quadrinodosa Breuning & de Jong, 1941
- Pterolophia quadrivittata Breuning, 1938
- Pterolophia raffrayi Breuning, 1970
- Pterolophia reducta (Pascoe, 1865)
- Pterolophia reduplicata Gressitt, 1951
- Pterolophia rhodesiana Breuning, 1962
- Pterolophia riouensis Breuning, 1938
- Pterolophia robinsoni (Gahan, 1906)
- Pterolophia robustior Breuning, 1961
- Pterolophia rubra Breuning, 1938
- Pterolophia rubricornis Gressitt, 1951
- Pterolophia rufescens (Pic, 1925)
- Pterolophia rufobrunnea Breuning, 1938
- Pterolophia rustenburgi Distant, 1898
- Pterolophia salebrosa Breuning, 1938
- Pterolophia sanghirica Gilmour, 1947
- Pterolophia sassensis Breuning, 1938
- Pterolophia schoudeteni Breuning, 1938
- Pterolophia scopulifera (Pascoe, 1865)
- Pterolophia scripta (Gerstaecker, 1871)
- Pterolophia scutellaris Breuning & de Jong, 1941
- Pterolophia secuta (Pascoe, 1865)
- Pterolophia semiarcuata Breuning, 1938
- Pterolophia semicircularis Breuning, 1938
- Pterolophia semilunaris Breuning, 1938
- Pterolophia serrata Gressitt, 1938
- Pterolophia serraticornis Breuning & de Jong, 1941
- Pterolophia serricornis Gressitt, 1937
- Pterolophia servilis Breuning, 1938
- Pterolophia siamana Breuning, 1970
- Pterolophia siamensis Breuning, 1938
- Pterolophia sibuyana Aurivillius, 1927
- Pterolophia sikkimana Breuning, 1973
- Pterolophia similata (Pascoe, 1865)
- Pterolophia similis (Jordan, 1894)
- Pterolophia simulans Breuning & de Jong, 1941
- Pterolophia sparsepuncticollis Breuning, 1961
- Pterolophia spinicornis Breuning, 1938
- Pterolophia spinifera (Quedenfeldt, 1888)
- Pterolophia sterculiae Breuning, 1938
- Pterolophia stheniodes Breuning, 1938
- Pterolophia subaequalis Breuning & de Jong, 1941
- Pterolophia subangusta Matsushita, 1933
- Pterolophia subbicarinata Breuning, 1968
- Pterolophia subchapaensis Breuning, 1968
- Pterolophia subflavescens Breuning, 1977
- Pterolophia subfulvisparsa Breuning, 1968
- Pterolophia subgrisescens Breuning, 1975
- Pterolophia subleiopodina Breuning & Ohbayashi, 1964
- Pterolophia subminutissima Breuning, 1966
- Pterolophia subnigrosparsa Breuning, 1961
- Pterolophia subovatula Breuning, 1977
- Pterolophia subrubra Breuning, 1968
- Pterolophia subtincta (Pascoe, 1865)
- Pterolophia subtubericollis Breuning, 1964
- Pterolophia subvariolosa Breuning, 1956
- Pterolophia suisapana Gressitt, 1951
- Pterolophia sulcatipennis Breuning & de Jong, 1941
- Pterolophia sumatrensis Breuning, 1938
- Pterolophia szetschuanica Breuning, 1973
- Pterolophia szewezycki Lepesme & Breuning, 1955
- Pterolophia tenebrica Breuning, 1938
- Pterolophia tenebricoides Breuning, 1976
- Pterolophia tengahensis Breuning, 1965
- Pterolophia teocchii Breuning, 1970
- Pterolophia thibetana Pic, 1925
- Pterolophia thomensis Breuning, 1938
- Pterolophia todui Breuning, 1982
- Pterolophia tonkinensis Breuning, 1938
- Pterolophia touzalini Breuning, 1973
- Pterolophia transversefasciatipennis Breuning, 1968
- Pterolophia transverseplagiata Breuning, 1938
- Pterolophia transverseunifasciata Breuning, 1972
- Pterolophia transversevittata Breuning, 1938
- Pterolophia triangularis Breuning, 1938
- Pterolophia trifasciculata Breuning, 1969
- Pterolophia tristis Breuning, 1938
- Pterolophia trivittata Breuning, 1940
- Pterolophia truncatipennis (Pic, 1951)
- Pterolophia tuberculatithorax Pic, 1926
- Pterolophia tuberculifera Breuning, 1938
- Pterolophia tuberculithorax Breuning, 1973
- Pterolophia tubericollis Breuning, 1938
- Pterolophia tuberipennis Breuning, 1939
- Pterolophia tuberosithorax Breuning, 1939
- Pterolophia ugandae Breuning, 1938
- Pterolophia univinculata (Heller, 1924)
- Pterolophia vagevittata Breuning, 1938
- Pterolophia varians Breuning, 1938
- Pterolophia variantennalis Breuning, 1970
- Pterolophia varievittata Breuning, 1949
- Pterolophia variolosa (Kolbe, 1893)
- Pterolophia virgulata Breuning, 1939
- Pterolophia viridana Breuning, 1938
- Pterolophia vittata Breuning, 1938
- Pterolophia vittaticollis Breuning & de Jong, 1941
- Pterolophia vitticollis Newman, 1842
- Pterolophia wittmeri Breuning, 1975
- Pterolophia yenae Breuning, 1963
- Pterolophia yunnana Breuning, 1968
- Pterolophia ziczac Breuning, 1938
- Pterolophia zonata (Bates, 1873)

subgenus Scapopraonetha

- Pterolophia bella Breuning, 1940
- Pterolophia laterivitta Breuning, 1942
- Pterolophia pygmaeola Breuning, 1938
- Pterolophia quadriplagiata Breuning, 1938
- Pterolophia spiniscapus Breuning, 1942

subgenus Sociopraonetha

- Pterolophia nigrocincta Gahan, 1894

subgenus Sordidopraonetha

- Pterolophia caledonica Breuning, 1976
- Pterolophia fuscolineata Breuning, 1938
- Pterolophia major Breuning, 1938
- Pterolophia sordidata Pascoe, 1865
- Pterolophia tristoides Breuning, 1938

subgenus Tricholychrosis

- Pterolophia albosignata Breuning, 1973

subgenus Trichopraonetha

- Pterolophia albofasciata Breuning, 1938
- Pterolophia fuscomaculata Breuning, 1938
- Pterolophia pilosipennis Breuning, 1943
- Pterolophia plurialbostictica Breuning, 1974
- Pterolophia subalbofasciata Gilmour & Breuning, 1963

subgenus Undulatopraonetha

- Pterolophia undulata (Pascoe, 1862)

subgenus Villosopraonetha

- Pterolophia javanica Breuning, 1938
- Pterolophia pilosella (Pascoe, 1865)
- Pterolophia trichofera Breuning, 1938
- Pterolophia villosa (Pascoe, 1866)

incertae sedis

- Pterolophia kubokii Hayashi, 1976
