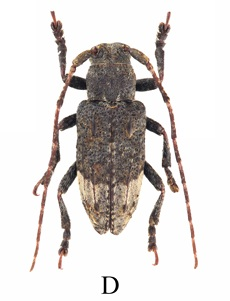

Scientific classification
- Kingdom: Animalia
- Phylum: Arthropoda
- Clade: Pancrustacea
- Class: Insecta
- Order: Coleoptera
- Suborder: Polyphaga
- Infraorder: Cucujiformia
- Family: Cerambycidae
- Genus: Pterolophia
- Species: P. zonata

Binomial name
- Pterolophia zonata (Bates, 1873)

Synonyms
- Praonetha zonata Bates, 1873

= Pterolophia zonata =

Species of beetle

Pterolophia zonata is a species of beetle in the family Cerambycidae. It was described by Henry Walter Bates in 1873. It is known from Taiwan and Japan.
