= Pterolophia rufipennis =

Scientific classification
- Kingdom: Animalia
- Phylum: Arthropoda
- Class: Insecta
- Order: Coleoptera
- Suborder: Polyphaga
- Infraorder: Cucujiformia
- Family: Cerambycidae
- Genus: Pterolophia
- Species: P. rufipennis

Binomial name
- Pterolophia rufipennis (Pic, 1923)

Synonyms
- Pterolophia (Hylobrotus) rufipennis (Pic, 1923); Lycrosis rufipennis Pic, 1923

Species of beetle

Pterolophia rufipennis is a species of beetle in the family Cerambycidae. It was described by Maurice Pic in 1923.
