= Pterolophia pilosella =

Scientific classification
- Domain: Eukaryota
- Kingdom: Animalia
- Phylum: Arthropoda
- Class: Insecta
- Order: Coleoptera
- Suborder: Polyphaga
- Infraorder: Cucujiformia
- Family: Cerambycidae
- Tribe: Pteropliini
- Genus: Pterolophia
- Species: P. pilosella

Binomial name
- Pterolophia pilosella (Pascoe, 1865)

Synonyms
- Pterolophia (Villosopraonetha) pilosella (Pascoe, 1865)

Species of beetle

Pterolophia pilosella is a species of beetle in the family Cerambycidae. It was described by Francis Polkinghorne Pascoe in 1865.
