= Pterolophia ingrata =

Scientific classification
- Kingdom: Animalia
- Phylum: Arthropoda
- Clade: Pancrustacea
- Class: Insecta
- Order: Coleoptera
- Suborder: Polyphaga
- Infraorder: Cucujiformia
- Family: Cerambycidae
- Genus: Pterolophia
- Species: P. ingrata

Binomial name
- Pterolophia ingrata (Pascoe, 1864)

Synonyms
- Cormia ingrata Pascoe, 1864

Species of beetle

Pterolophia ingrata is a species of beetle in the family Cerambycidae. It was described by Francis Polkinghorne Pascoe in 1864.

== Subspecies ==
- Pterolophia ingrata nyassana Sudre & Téocchi, 2002
- Pterolophia ingrata ingrata (Pascoe, 1864)
