= Pterolophia sulcatithorax =

Scientific classification
- Kingdom: Animalia
- Phylum: Arthropoda
- Clade: Pancrustacea
- Class: Insecta
- Order: Coleoptera
- Suborder: Polyphaga
- Infraorder: Cucujiformia
- Family: Cerambycidae
- Genus: Pterolophia
- Species: P. sulcatithorax

Binomial name
- Pterolophia sulcatithorax Pic, 1926

Synonyms
- Pterolophia (Ale) sulcatithorax Pic, 1926

Species of beetle

Pterolophia sulcatithorax is a species of beetle in the family Cerambycidae. It was described by Maurice Pic in 1926.
