= Pterolophia dentifera =

Scientific classification
- Kingdom: Animalia
- Phylum: Arthropoda
- Clade: Pancrustacea
- Class: Insecta
- Order: Coleoptera
- Suborder: Polyphaga
- Infraorder: Cucujiformia
- Family: Cerambycidae
- Genus: Pterolophia
- Species: P. dentifera

Binomial name
- Pterolophia dentifera (Olivier, 1795)

Synonyms
- Sthenias minor Duvivier, 1891; Cerambyx dentifer Olivier, 1795; Theticus lunulatus m. alboreducta Breuning & Teocchi, 1982; Theticus lunulatus Hintz, 1919; Pterolophia angolensis Breuning, 1938

Species of beetle

Pterolophia dentifera is a species of beetle in the family Cerambycidae. It was described by Guillaume-Antoine Olivier in 1795.
