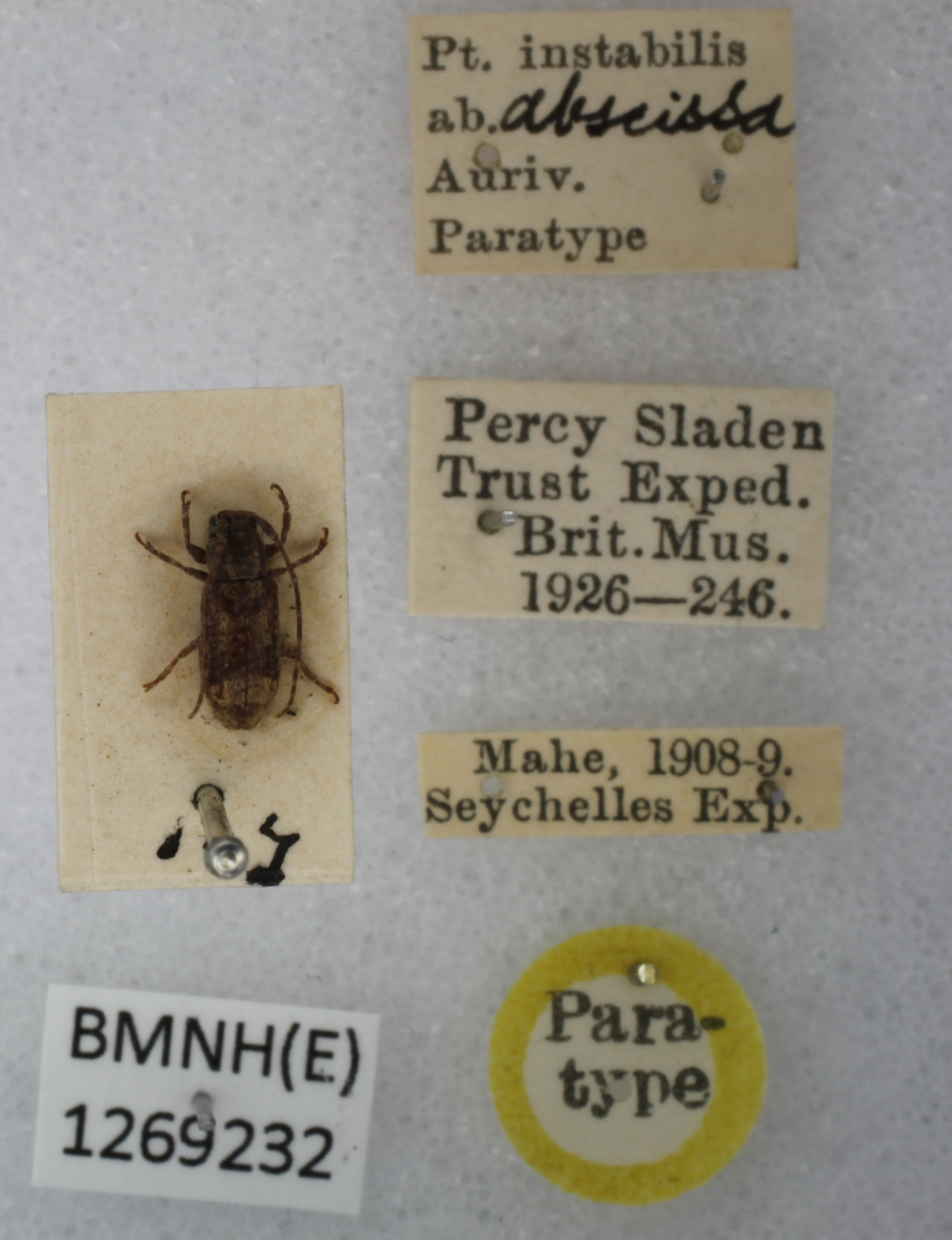

Scientific classification
- Kingdom: Animalia
- Phylum: Arthropoda
- Clade: Pancrustacea
- Class: Insecta
- Order: Coleoptera
- Suborder: Polyphaga
- Infraorder: Cucujiformia
- Family: Cerambycidae
- Genus: Pterolophia
- Species: P. instabilis

Binomial name
- Pterolophia instabilis Aurivillius, 1922

= Pterolophia instabilis =

Species of beetle

Pterolophia instabilis is a species of beetle in the family Cerambycidae. It was described by Per Olof Christopher Aurivillius in 1922. It is known from Seychelles.

== Varietas ==
- Pterolophia instabilis var. suturalis Aurivillius, 1922
- Pterolophia instabilis var. unicolor Aurivillius, 1922
- Pterolophia instabilis var. minuscula Aurivillius, 1922
- Pterolophia instabilis var. nigrovittata Aurivillius, 1922
- Pterolophia instabilis var. abscissa Aurivillius, 1922
- Pterolophia instabilis var. transversa Aurivillius, 1922
