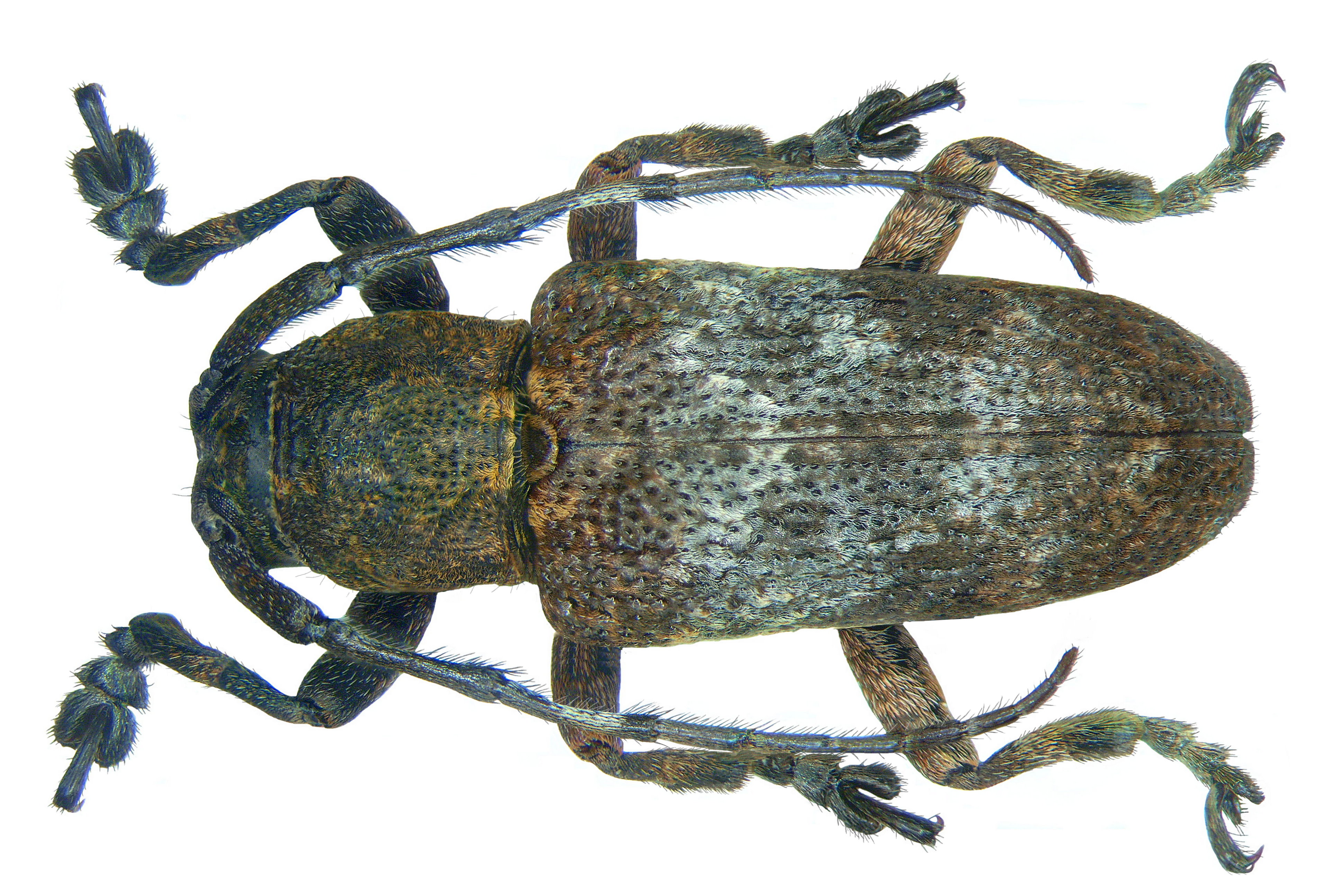

Scientific classification
- Kingdom: Animalia
- Phylum: Arthropoda
- Clade: Pancrustacea
- Class: Insecta
- Order: Coleoptera
- Suborder: Polyphaga
- Infraorder: Cucujiformia
- Family: Cerambycidae
- Genus: Pterolophia
- Species: P. melanura

Binomial name
- Pterolophia melanura (Pascoe, 1857)

Synonyms
- Praonetha moensi Ritsema, 1881; Praonetha melanura Pascoe, 1857; Praonetha quadraticollis Pascoe, 1865; Praonetha montana Pascoe, 1865

= Pterolophia melanura =

Species of beetle

Pterolophia melanura is a species of beetle in the family Cerambycidae. It was described by Francis Polkinghorne Pascoe in 1857. It has a wide distribution in Asia.

== Subspecies ==
- Pterolophia melanura melanura (Pascoe, 1857)
- Pterolophia melanura baweanensis Gilmour & Breuning, 1963
