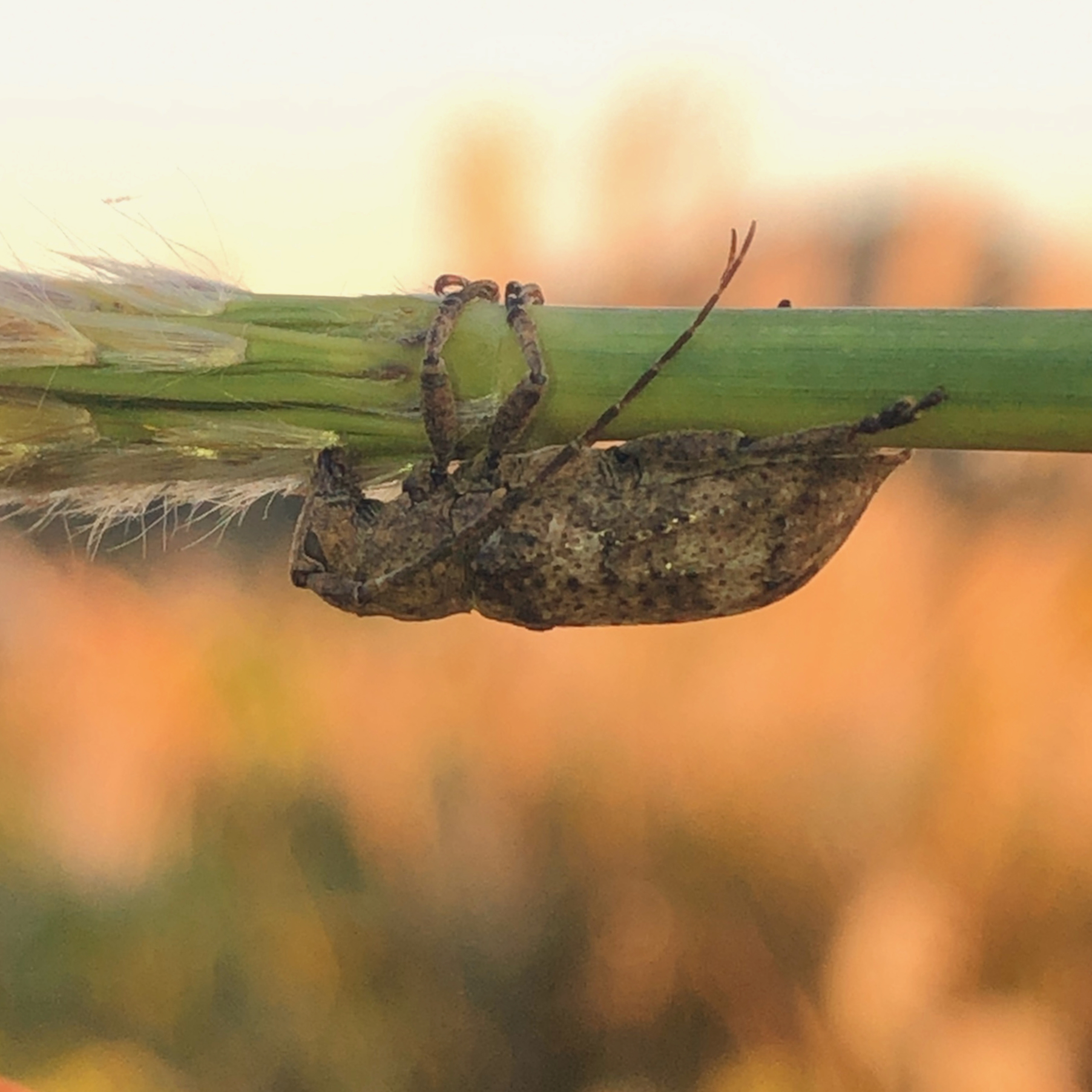
- A brown-spotted longicorn beetle holding on to a blade of grass

Scientific classification
- Kingdom: Animalia
- Phylum: Arthropoda
- Clade: Pancrustacea
- Class: Insecta
- Order: Coleoptera
- Suborder: Polyphaga
- Infraorder: Cucujiformia
- Family: Cerambycidae
- Genus: Pterolophia
- Species: P. caudata

Binomial name
- Pterolophia caudata (Bates, 1873)

Synonyms
- Praonetha caudata Bates, 1873

= Pterolophia caudata =

Species of beetle

Pterolophia caudata is a species of beetle in the family Cerambycidae. It was first described by Henry Walter Bates in 1873, as Praonetha caudata.

This beetle is native to Japan and Korea.

== Subspecies ==
- Pterolophia caudata curtipennis Makihara, 1980
- Pterolophia caudata caudata (Bates, 1873)
