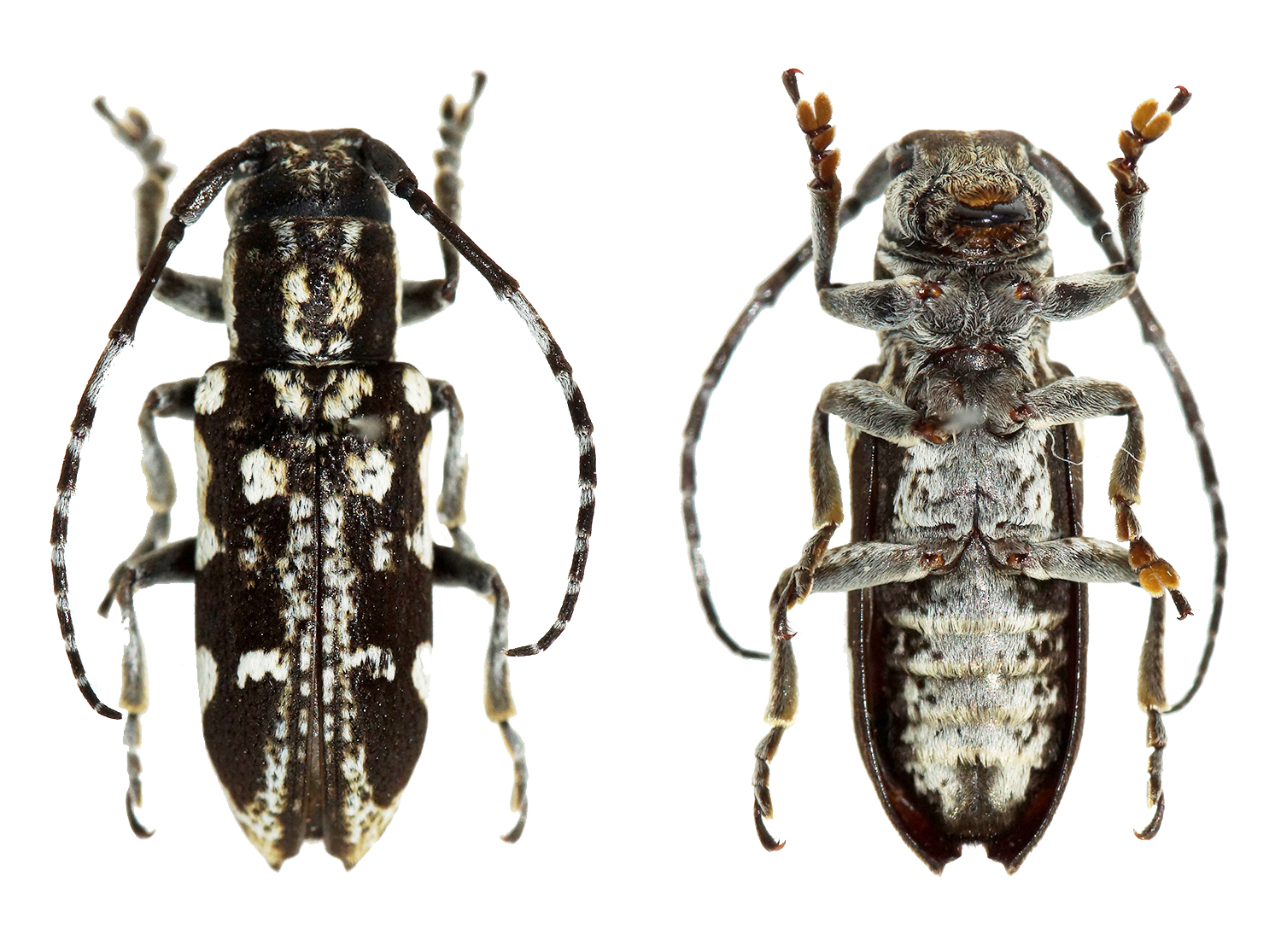

Scientific classification
- Domain: Eukaryota
- Kingdom: Animalia
- Phylum: Arthropoda
- Class: Insecta
- Order: Coleoptera
- Suborder: Polyphaga
- Infraorder: Cucujiformia
- Family: Cerambycidae
- Tribe: Pteropliini
- Genus: Pterolophia
- Species: P. luctuosa

Binomial name
- Pterolophia luctuosa (Pascoe, 1863)

Synonyms
- Mycerinus luctuosus Pascoe, 1863; Lychrosis luctuosus (Pascoe, 1863)

= Pterolophia luctuosa =

Species of beetle

Pterolophia luctuosa is a species of beetle in the family Cerambycidae. It was described by Francis Polkinghorne Pascoe in 1863. It is known from Australia.
