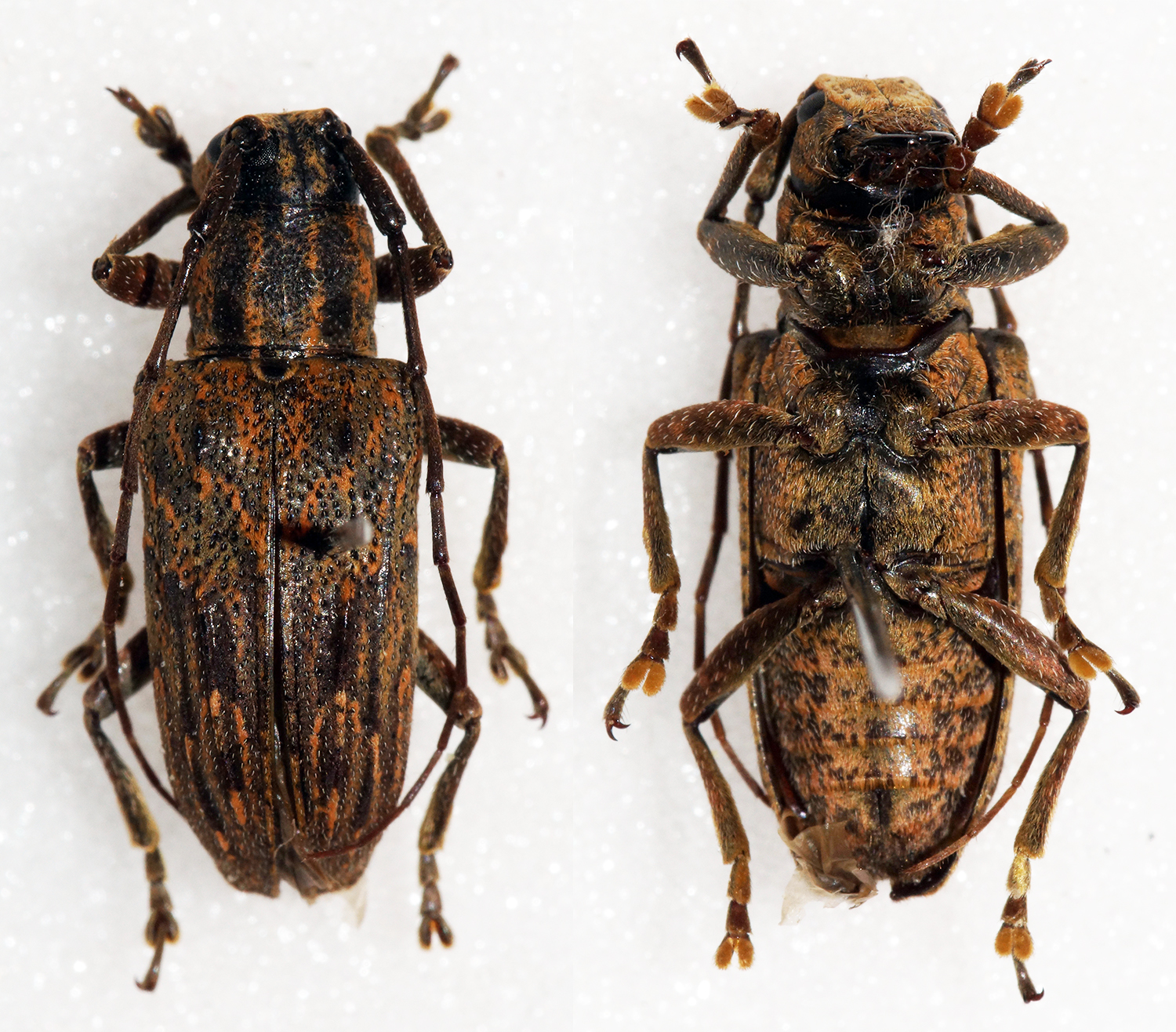
- Sex: Male. Size: 16mm

Scientific classification
- Kingdom: Animalia
- Phylum: Arthropoda
- Clade: Pancrustacea
- Class: Insecta
- Order: Coleoptera
- Suborder: Polyphaga
- Infraorder: Cucujiformia
- Family: Cerambycidae
- Genus: Pterolophia
- Species: P. vitticollis

Binomial name
- Pterolophia vitticollis Newman, 1842

Synonyms
- Pterolophia parapilosipes Breuning, 1980; Pterolophia (Pilosipraonetha) parapilosipes Breuning, 1980

= Pterolophia vitticollis =

Species of beetle

Pterolophia vitticollis is a species of beetle in the family Cerambycidae. It was described by Newman in 1842. It is known from the Philippines.
