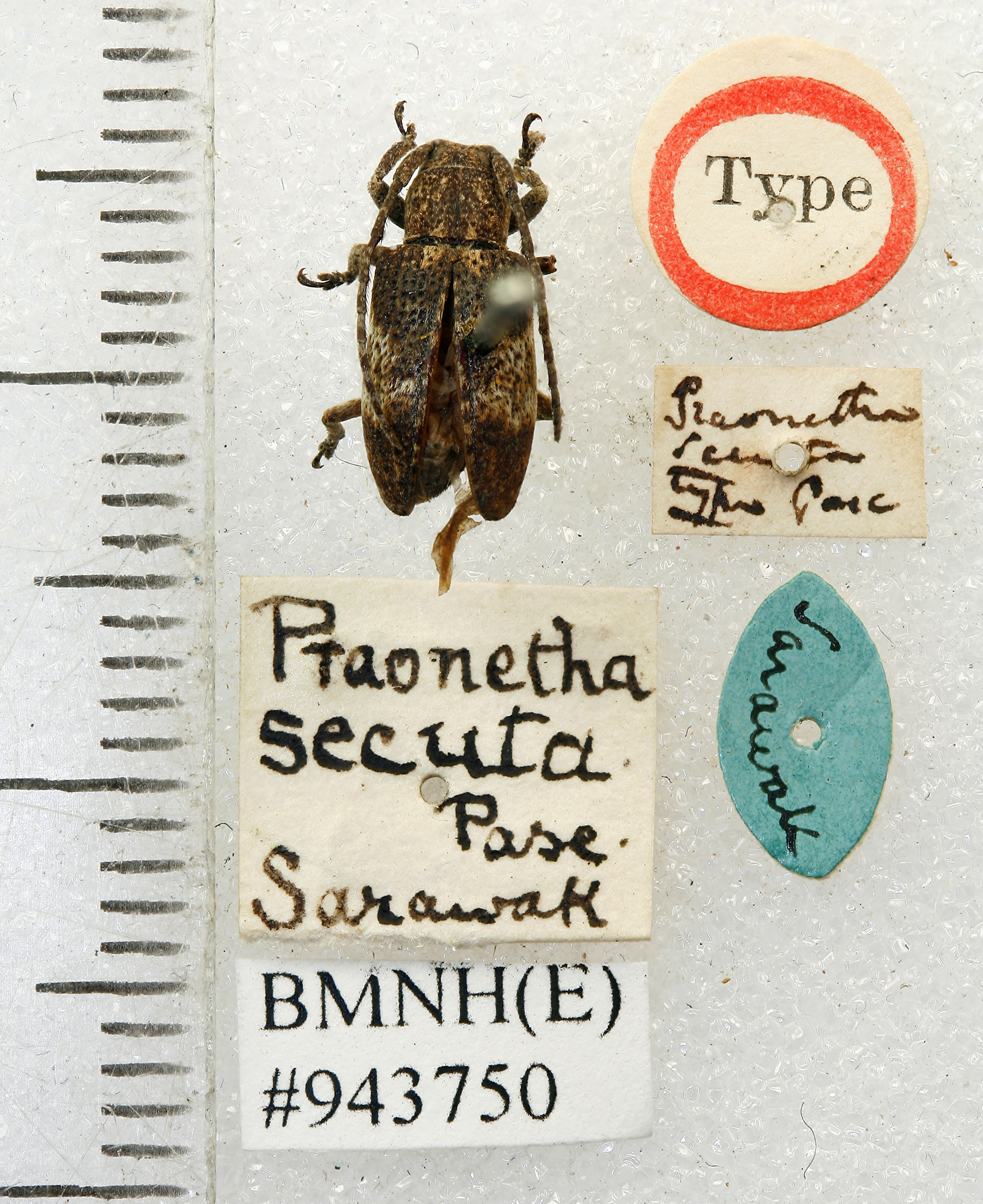

Scientific classification
- Kingdom: Animalia
- Phylum: Arthropoda
- Clade: Pancrustacea
- Class: Insecta
- Order: Coleoptera
- Suborder: Polyphaga
- Infraorder: Cucujiformia
- Family: Cerambycidae
- Genus: Pterolophia
- Species: P. secuta

Binomial name
- Pterolophia secuta (Pascoe, 1865)

Synonyms
- Pterolophia fuscobasalis Aurivillius, 1927; Praonetha secuta Pascoe, 1865

= Pterolophia secuta =

Species of beetle

Pterolophia secuta is a species of beetle in the family Cerambycidae. It was described by Francis Polkinghorne Pascoe in 1865. It is known from the Philippines, Malaysia, Borneo, and Sulawesi.
