= Pterolophia costalis =

Scientific classification
- Kingdom: Animalia
- Phylum: Arthropoda
- Clade: Pancrustacea
- Class: Insecta
- Order: Coleoptera
- Suborder: Polyphaga
- Infraorder: Cucujiformia
- Family: Cerambycidae
- Genus: Pterolophia
- Species: P. costalis

Binomial name
- Pterolophia costalis (Pascoe, 1862)

Synonyms
- Praonetha pituitosa Pascoe, 1865; Praonetha costalis Pascoe, 1862; Praonetha privata Pascoe, 1865

Species of beetle

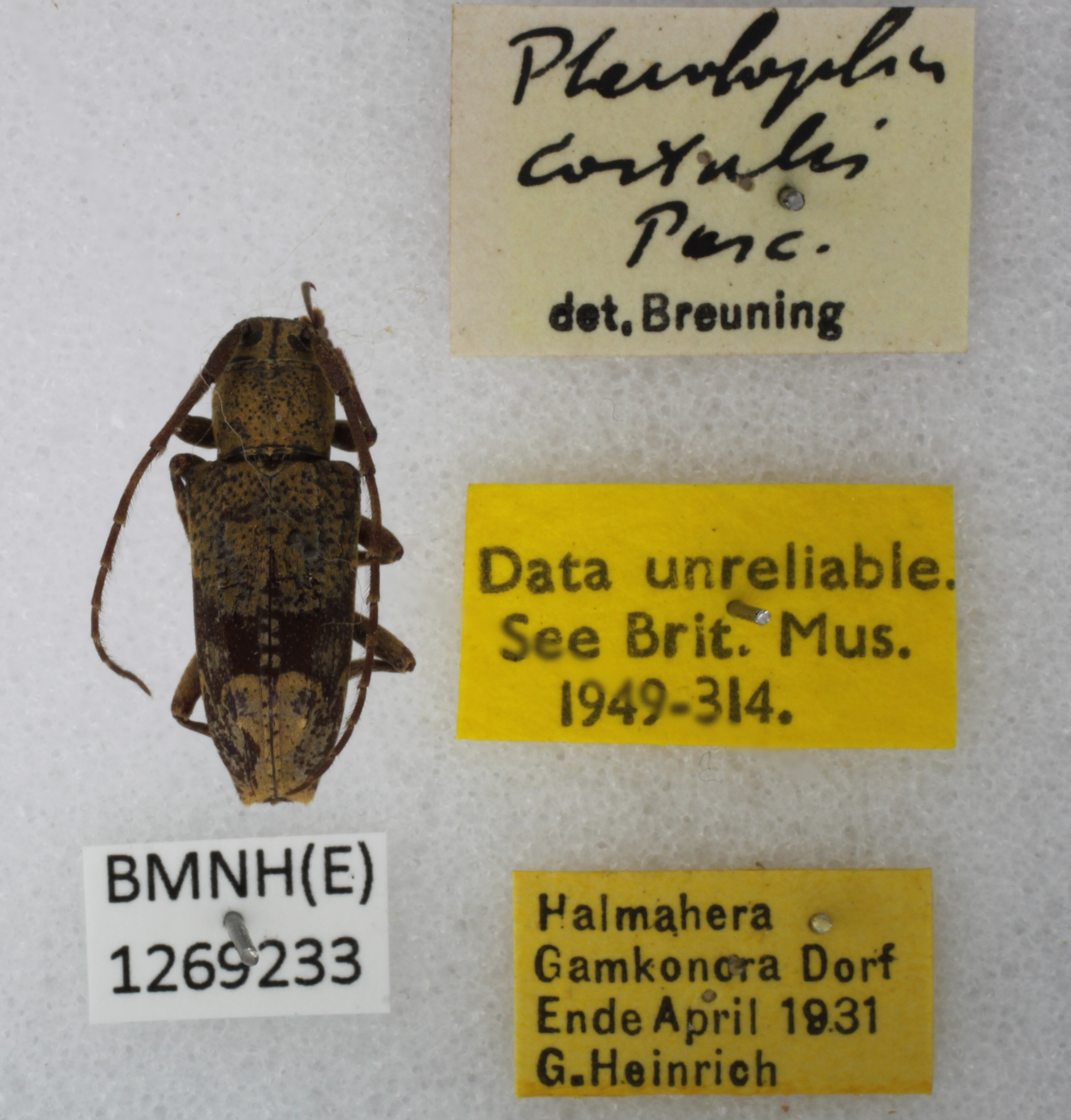

Pterolophia costalis is a species of beetle in the family Cerambycidae. It was described by Francis Polkinghorne Pascoe in 1862.
