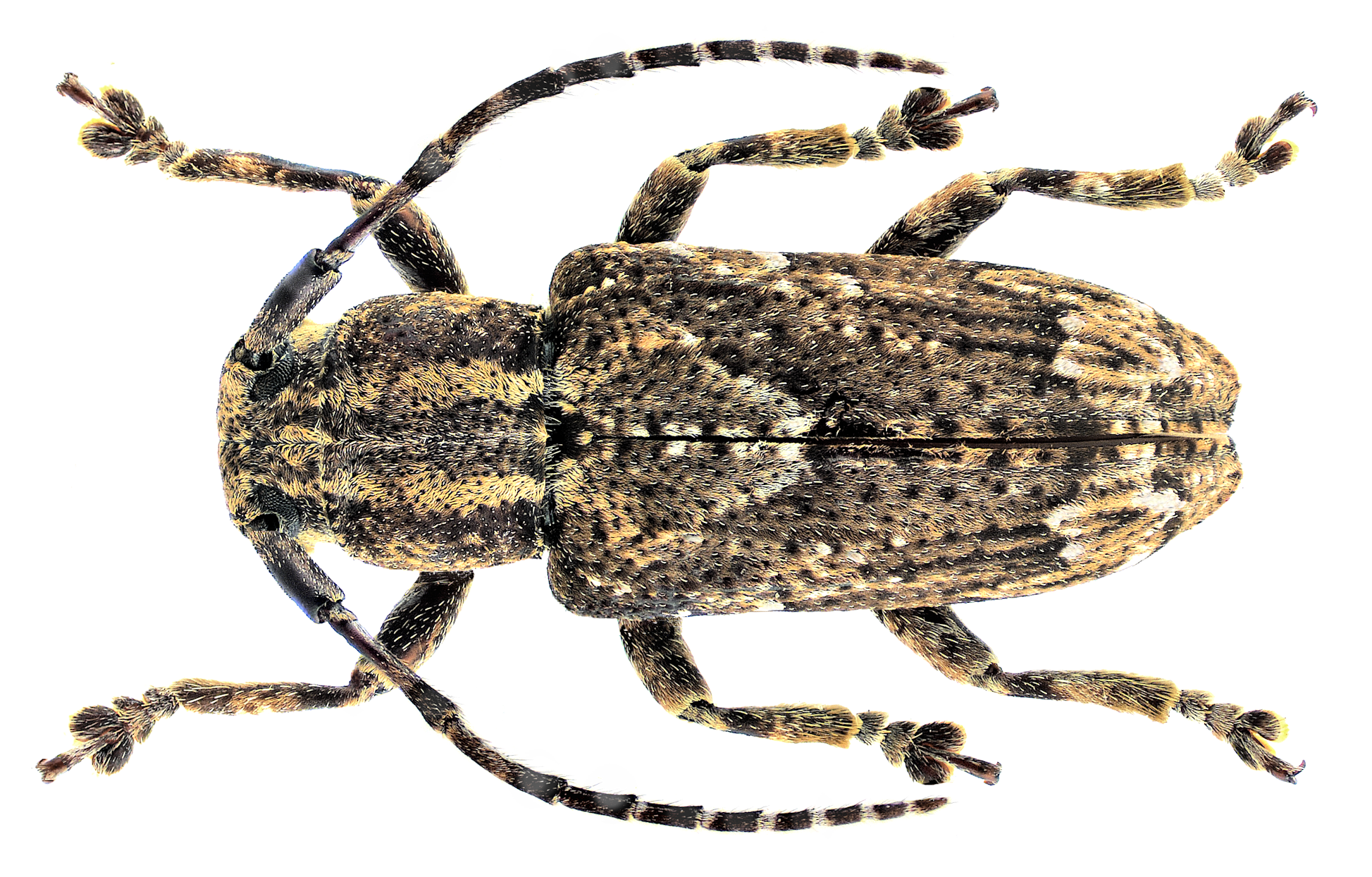
- Pterolophia (Hylobrotus) laosensis, from Thailand, 2021 (photo by U. Schmidt)

Scientific classification
- Kingdom: Animalia
- Phylum: Arthropoda
- Clade: Pancrustacea
- Class: Insecta
- Order: Coleoptera
- Suborder: Polyphaga
- Infraorder: Cucujiformia
- Family: Cerambycidae
- Genus: Pterolophia
- Species: P. laosensis

Binomial name
- Pterolophia laosensis Pic, 1926

= Pterolophia laosensis =

Species of beetle

Pterolophia laosensis is a species of beetle in the family Cerambycidae. It was described by Maurice Pic in 1926.
