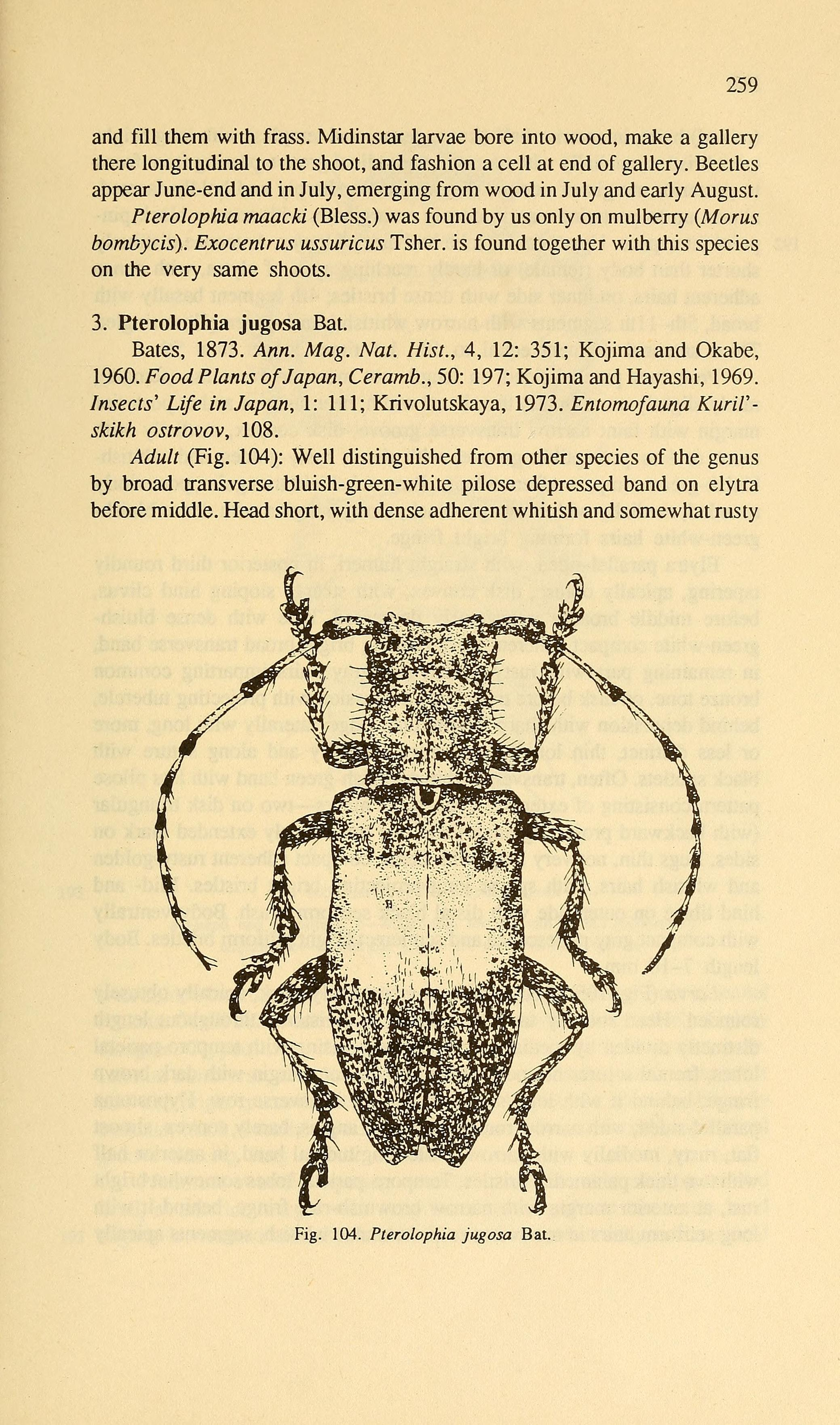

Scientific classification
- Kingdom: Animalia
- Phylum: Arthropoda
- Clade: Pancrustacea
- Class: Insecta
- Order: Coleoptera
- Suborder: Polyphaga
- Infraorder: Cucujiformia
- Family: Cerambycidae
- Genus: Pterolophia
- Species: P. jugosa

Binomial name
- Pterolophia jugosa Bates, 1873

= Pterolophia jugosa =

Species of beetle

Pterolophia jugosa is a species of beetle in the family Cerambycidae. It was described by Henry Walter Bates in 1873.

== Subspecies ==
- Pterolophia jugosa jugosa Bates, 1873
- Pterolophia jugosa carinissima Takakuwa, 1984
