= Pterolophia punctigera =

Scientific classification
- Kingdom: Animalia
- Phylum: Arthropoda
- Clade: Pancrustacea
- Class: Insecta
- Order: Coleoptera
- Suborder: Polyphaga
- Infraorder: Cucujiformia
- Family: Cerambycidae
- Genus: Pterolophia
- Species: P. punctigera

Binomial name
- Pterolophia punctigera (Pascoe, 1865)

Synonyms
- Praonetha punctigera Pascoe, 1865

Species of longhorn beetle

Pterolophia punctigera is a species of longhorn beetle in the family Cerambycidae, first described by Francis Polkinghorne Pascoe in 1865. It is found in Southeast Asia, particularly in Borneo, Sumatra, and Peninsular Malaysia.

== Distribution ==
Pterolophia punctigera occurs in tropical regions of Southeast Asia, including Borneo, Sumatra, and Peninsular Malaysia.

== Habitat ==
This beetle species is typically associated with tropical rainforests and may be found on decaying wood and tree bark, where adults and larvae feed.
