= Pterolophia gibbosipennis =

Scientific classification
- Kingdom: Animalia
- Phylum: Arthropoda
- Clade: Pancrustacea
- Class: Insecta
- Order: Coleoptera
- Suborder: Polyphaga
- Infraorder: Cucujiformia
- Family: Cerambycidae
- Genus: Pterolophia
- Species: P. gibbosipennis

Binomial name
- Pterolophia gibbosipennis Pic, 1926

Synonyms
- Pseudale gibbosipennis Hayashi, 1983

Species of beetle

Pterolophia gibbosipennis is a species of beetle in the family Cerambycidae. It was described by Maurice Pic in 1926.

== Subspecies ==
- Pterolophia gibbosipennis iriomotei Breuning & Ohbayashi,
- Pterolophia gibbosipennis gibbosipennis Pic, 1926
- Pterolophia gibbosipennis subcristipennis Breuning & Ohbayashi,
- Pterolophia gibbosipennis kuniyoshii Hayashi, 1968
