= Pterolophia multicarinata =

Scientific classification
- Kingdom: Animalia
- Phylum: Arthropoda
- Clade: Pancrustacea
- Class: Insecta
- Order: Coleoptera
- Suborder: Polyphaga
- Infraorder: Cucujiformia
- Family: Cerambycidae
- Genus: Pterolophia
- Species: P. multicarinata

Binomial name
- Pterolophia multicarinata Breuning, 1938

Synonyms
- Pterolophia rugulosa Breuning, 1961; Pterolophia obliquefasciata Breuning, 1938; Pterolophia bifasciculatoides Breuning, 1986; Pterolophia obliquelineata Breuning, 1986 nec Breuning, 1938; Pterolophia subfusca Breuning, 1938

Species of beetle

Pterolophia multicarinata is a species of beetle in the family Cerambycidae. It was described by Stephan von Breuning in 1938. It is known from Tanzania, the Ivory Coast, the Central African Republic, Cameroon, and the Republic of the Congo.
