= Pterolophia postflavomaculata =

Scientific classification
- Kingdom: Animalia
- Phylum: Arthropoda
- Clade: Pancrustacea
- Class: Insecta
- Order: Coleoptera
- Suborder: Polyphaga
- Infraorder: Cucujiformia
- Family: Cerambycidae
- Genus: Pterolophia
- Species: P. postflavomaculata

Binomial name
- Pterolophia postflavomaculata Breuning, 1969

Species of beetle

Pterolophia postflavomaculata is a species of beetle in the family Cerambycidae. It was described by Stephan von Breuning in 1969.

== Taxonomy ==
Pterolophia postflavomaculata is a species of longhorn beetle in the family Cerambycidae. It was described by Stephan von Breuning in 1969. The species belongs to the genus Pterolophia, which is classified in the subfamily Lamiinae.

== Distribution ==
The species is listed in a checklist of Lamiinae recorded from Cameroon, suggesting that Cameroon is part of its documented geographic distribution.
