= Pterolophia bigibbera =

Scientific classification
- Kingdom: Animalia
- Phylum: Arthropoda
- Clade: Pancrustacea
- Class: Insecta
- Order: Coleoptera
- Suborder: Polyphaga
- Infraorder: Cucujiformia
- Family: Cerambycidae
- Genus: Pterolophia
- Species: P. bigibbera

Binomial name
- Pterolophia bigibbera (Newman, 1842)

Synonyms
- Pterolophia camura Newman, 1842; Pterolophia binodosa (Bates) Schwarzer, 1925; Pterolophia bigibbera m. medionigra Breuning, 1974; Pterolophia saipana Ohbayashi, 1941; Praonetha binodosa Bates, 1866; Mesosa bigibbera Newman, 1842

Species of beetle

Pterolophia bigibbera is a species of beetle in the family Cerambycidae. It was described by Newman in 1842. It is known from the Philippines, Japan, and Taiwan.
