= Pterolophia lundbladi =

Scientific classification
- Kingdom: Animalia
- Phylum: Arthropoda
- Clade: Pancrustacea
- Class: Insecta
- Order: Coleoptera
- Suborder: Polyphaga
- Infraorder: Cucujiformia
- Family: Cerambycidae
- Genus: Pterolophia
- Species: P. lundbladi

Binomial name
- Pterolophia lundbladi Breuning, 1938

Species of beetle

Pterolophia lundbladi is a species of beetle in the family Cerambycidae. This beetle is found in Australia.

== Taxonomy ==
Pterolophia lundbladi was described by entomologist Stephan von Breuning in 1938. Its type location is Australia.

== Etymology ==
The genus name Pterolophia comes from the Greek words "pteron" (wing) and "lophos" (tuft or crest). The specific name, lundbladi, is named for Swedish naturalist and entomologist Olof Lundblad.
