= Pterolophia undulata =

Scientific classification
- Kingdom: Animalia
- Phylum: Arthropoda
- Class: Insecta
- Order: Coleoptera
- Suborder: Polyphaga
- Infraorder: Cucujiformia
- Family: Cerambycidae
- Genus: Pterolophia
- Species: P. undulata

Binomial name
- Pterolophia undulata (Pascoe, 1862)

Synonyms
- Pterolophia (Undulatopraonetha) undulata (Pascoe, 1862)

Species of beetle

Pterolophia undulata is a species of beetle in the family Cerambycidae. It was described by Francis Polkinghorne Pascoe in 1862. It is known from Moluccas.

== Subspecies ==
- Pterolophia undulata undulata (Pascoe, 1862)
- Pterolophia undulata satrapa (Pascoe, 1865)
- Pterolophia undulata tidorensis Breuning & de Jong, 1941
