= Pterolophia mediocarinata =

Scientific classification
- Kingdom: Animalia
- Phylum: Arthropoda
- Clade: Pancrustacea
- Class: Insecta
- Order: Coleoptera
- Suborder: Polyphaga
- Infraorder: Cucujiformia
- Family: Cerambycidae
- Genus: Pterolophia
- Species: P. mediocarinata

Binomial name
- Pterolophia mediocarinata Breuning, 1939

Synonyms
- Pterolophia rubida Breuning & de Jong, 1941; Pterolophia excavatipennis Breuning, 1939; Pterolophia medioalba Breuning & de Jong, 1941; Pterolophia immaculata Breuning & de Jong, 1941

Species of beetle

Pterolophia mediocarinata is a species of beetle in the family Cerambycidae. It was described by Stephan von Breuning in 1939. It is known from Sumatra, Java and Borneo.
