= Pterolophia rustenburgi =

Scientific classification
- Kingdom: Animalia
- Phylum: Arthropoda
- Clade: Pancrustacea
- Class: Insecta
- Order: Coleoptera
- Suborder: Polyphaga
- Infraorder: Cucujiformia
- Family: Cerambycidae
- Genus: Pterolophia
- Species: P. rustenburgi

Binomial name
- Pterolophia rustenburgi Distant, 1898

Species of beetle

Pterolophia rustenburgi is a species of beetle in the family Cerambycidae. It was described by William Lucas Distant in 1898.

== Subspecies ==
- Pterolophia rustenburgi rustenburgi Distant, 1898
- Pterolophia rustenburgi mourgliai Téocchi, Jiroux & Sudre, 2004
- Pterolophia rustenburgi rufomarmorata Breuning, 1964
