= Pterolophia ploemi =

Scientific classification
- Kingdom: Animalia
- Phylum: Arthropoda
- Clade: Pancrustacea
- Class: Insecta
- Order: Coleoptera
- Suborder: Polyphaga
- Infraorder: Cucujiformia
- Family: Cerambycidae
- Genus: Pterolophia
- Species: P. ploemi

Binomial name
- Pterolophia ploemi (Lacordaire, 1872)

Synonyms
- Praonetha koehleri Ritsema, 1876; Praonetha cristata Jordan, 1894; Hylobrotus ploemi Lacordaire, 1872; Pterolophia fasciculosa Aurivillius, 1913

Species of beetle

Pterolophia ploemi is a species of beetle in the family Cerambycidae. It was described by Lacordaire in 1872. It is known from Java, Borneo, and Malaysia.
