= Pterolophia medioplagiata =

Scientific classification
- Kingdom: Animalia
- Phylum: Arthropoda
- Clade: Pancrustacea
- Class: Insecta
- Order: Coleoptera
- Suborder: Polyphaga
- Infraorder: Cucujiformia
- Family: Cerambycidae
- Genus: Pterolophia
- Species: P. medioplagiata

Binomial name
- Pterolophia medioplagiata Breuning, 1938

Synonyms
- Pterolophia grossescapa Breuning, 1986 nec Breuning, 1938; Pterolophia forchhammeri Breuning, 1986; Pterolophia medioplagiata var. nyassana Breuning, 1961

Species of beetle

Pterolophia medioplagiata is a species of beetle in the family Cerambycidae. It was described by Stephan von Breuning in 1938. It has a wide distribution in Africa.
