= Pterolophia tuberculatrix =

Scientific classification
- Kingdom: Animalia
- Phylum: Arthropoda
- Clade: Pancrustacea
- Class: Insecta
- Order: Coleoptera
- Suborder: Polyphaga
- Infraorder: Cucujiformia
- Family: Cerambycidae
- Genus: Pterolophia
- Species: P. tuberculatrix

Binomial name
- Pterolophia tuberculatrix (Fabricius, 1781)

Synonyms
- Pterolophia (Hylobrotus) tuberculatrix (Fabricius, 1781); Cerambyx tuberculator Fabricius, 1781

Species of beetle

Pterolophia tuberculatrix is a species of beetle in the family Cerambycidae. It was described by Johan Christian Fabricius in 1781. It contains the varietas Pterolophia tuberculatrix var. obsoleta.
