= Pterolophia suginoi =

Scientific classification
- Domain: Eukaryota
- Kingdom: Animalia
- Phylum: Arthropoda
- Class: Insecta
- Order: Coleoptera
- Suborder: Polyphaga
- Infraorder: Cucujiformia
- Family: Cerambycidae
- Tribe: Pteropliini
- Genus: Pterolophia
- Species: P. suginoi

Binomial name
- Pterolophia suginoi Makihara, 1986

Synonyms
- Pterolophia (Pseudale) suginoi Makihara, 1986

Species of beetle

Pterolophia suginoi is a species of beetle in the family Cerambycidae. It was described by Hiroshi Makihara in 1986. Its exact habitat is unknown, but it would be unable to live in an aquatic habitat. It is an accepted species, and it has the "accepted "species" taxonomic status.
