= Pterolophia lepida =

Scientific classification
- Kingdom: Animalia
- Phylum: Arthropoda
- Clade: Pancrustacea
- Class: Insecta
- Order: Coleoptera
- Suborder: Polyphaga
- Infraorder: Cucujiformia
- Family: Cerambycidae
- Genus: Pterolophia
- Species: P. lepida

Binomial name
- Pterolophia lepida Breuning, 1938

Synonyms
- Pterolophia ivorensis Breuning, 1967

Species of beetle

Pterolophia lepida is a species of beetle in the family Cerambycidae. It was described by Stephan von Breuning in 1938. It is known from the Ivory Coast, the Central African Republic, Cameroon, and the Republic of the Congo. It feeds on Celtis zenkeri. It contains the varietas Pterolophia lepida var. szewezycki.
