= Pterolophia arabica =

Scientific classification
- Domain: Eukaryota
- Kingdom: Animalia
- Phylum: Arthropoda
- Class: Insecta
- Order: Coleoptera
- Suborder: Polyphaga
- Infraorder: Cucujiformia
- Family: Cerambycidae
- Tribe: Pteropliini
- Genus: Pterolophia
- Species: P. arabica

Binomial name
- Pterolophia arabica Teocchi, 1992

Species of beetle

Pterolophia (Arabopraonetha) arabica is a species of beetle in the family Cerambycidae. It is the scientific name of a group of Lamiinae, which are flat-faced longhorned beetles. It was described by Pierre Téocchi in 1991.

== Habitat ==
Pterolophia arabica are natively found in the Arabian Peninsula in a desert habitat.
