= Pterolophia albovariegata =

Scientific classification
- Kingdom: Animalia
- Phylum: Arthropoda
- Clade: Pancrustacea
- Class: Insecta
- Order: Coleoptera
- Suborder: Polyphaga
- Infraorder: Cucujiformia
- Family: Cerambycidae
- Genus: Pterolophia
- Species: P. albovariegata

Binomial name
- Pterolophia albovariegata Breuning, 1938

Synonyms
- Pterolophia parallela Breuning, 1938

Species of beetle

Pterolophia albovariegata is a species of beetle in the family Cerambycidae. It was described by Stephan von Breuning in 1938.

== Subspecies ==
- Pterolophia albovariegata kenyana Breuning, 1961
- Pterolophia albovariegata albovariegata Breuning, 1938
