= Pterolophia pilosipennis =

Scientific classification
- Kingdom: Animalia
- Phylum: Arthropoda
- Clade: Pancrustacea
- Class: Insecta
- Order: Coleoptera
- Suborder: Polyphaga
- Infraorder: Cucujiformia
- Family: Cerambycidae
- Genus: Pterolophia
- Species: P. pilosipennis

Binomial name
- Pterolophia pilosipennis Breuning, 1943

Synonyms
- Pterolophia (Trichopraonetha) pilosipennis Breuning, 1943

Species of beetle

Pterolophia pilosipennis is a species of beetle in the family Cerambycidae. It was described by Stephan von Breuning in 1943. Pterolophia pilosipennis is 8.5 millimeters (0.3 in) in length.
