= Pterolophia consularis =

Scientific classification
- Kingdom: Animalia
- Phylum: Arthropoda
- Clade: Pancrustacea
- Class: Insecta
- Order: Coleoptera
- Suborder: Polyphaga
- Infraorder: Cucujiformia
- Family: Cerambycidae
- Genus: Pterolophia
- Species: P. consularis

Binomial name
- Pterolophia consularis (Pascoe, 1866)

Synonyms
- Pterolophia cervina Gressitt, 1939; Pterolophia ochreomaculipennis Breuning, 1968; Praonetha cristulata Fairmaire, 1896

Species of beetle

Pterolophia consularis is a species of beetle in the family Cerambycidae. It was described by Francis Polkinghorne Pascoe in 1866.
