= Pterolophia obliquestriata =

Scientific classification
- Kingdom: Animalia
- Phylum: Arthropoda
- Clade: Pancrustacea
- Class: Insecta
- Order: Coleoptera
- Suborder: Polyphaga
- Infraorder: Cucujiformia
- Family: Cerambycidae
- Genus: Pterolophia
- Species: P. obliquestriata

Binomial name
- Pterolophia obliquestriata Breuning, 1938

Synonyms
- Pterolophia (Ale) obliqueplagiata Breuning, 1938

Species of beetle

Pterolophia obliquestriata is a species of beetle in the family Cerambycidae, the tribe Pteropliini and the genus Pterolophia. It was described by Stephan von Breuning in 1938 and is to be found in Java.
