= Pterolophia albivenosa =

Scientific classification
- Kingdom: Animalia
- Phylum: Arthropoda
- Clade: Pancrustacea
- Class: Insecta
- Order: Coleoptera
- Suborder: Polyphaga
- Infraorder: Cucujiformia
- Family: Cerambycidae
- Genus: Pterolophia
- Species: P. albivenosa

Binomial name
- Pterolophia albivenosa (Pascoe, 1865)

Synonyms
- Praonetha albivenosa Pascoe, 1865

Species of beetle

Pterolophia albivenosa is a species of beetle in the family Cerambycidae. It was described by Francis Polkinghorne Pascoe in 1865. It is known from Vietnam, Java, Borneo, Sumatra, and Malaysia.
