= Pterolophia subalbofasciata =

Scientific classification
- Kingdom: Animalia
- Phylum: Arthropoda
- Class: Insecta
- Order: Coleoptera
- Suborder: Polyphaga
- Infraorder: Cucujiformia
- Family: Cerambycidae
- Genus: Pterolophia
- Species: P. subalbofasciata

Binomial name
- Pterolophia subalbofasciata Gilmour & Breuning, 1963

Synonyms
- Pterolophia (Trichopraonetha) subalbofasciata Gilmour & Breuning, 1963

Species of beetle

Pterolophia subalbofasciata is a species of beetle in the family Cerambycidae. It was described by E. Forrest Gilmour and Stephan von Breuning in 1963. It is known from Borneo.
