= Pterolophia afflicta =

Scientific classification
- Domain: Eukaryota
- Kingdom: Animalia
- Phylum: Arthropoda
- Class: Insecta
- Order: Coleoptera
- Suborder: Polyphaga
- Infraorder: Cucujiformia
- Family: Cerambycidae
- Tribe: Pteropliini
- Genus: Pterolophia
- Species: P. afflicta

Binomial name
- Pterolophia afflicta (Pascoe, 1867)

Synonyms
- Lychrosis afflictus Pascoe, 1867

Species of beetle

Pterolophia afflicta is a species of beetle in the family Cerambycidae. It was described by Francis Polkinghorne Pascoe in 1867, originally under the genus Lychrosis. It is known from Australia.
