= Pterolophia bisbinodula =

Scientific classification
- Kingdom: Animalia
- Phylum: Arthropoda
- Clade: Pancrustacea
- Class: Insecta
- Order: Coleoptera
- Suborder: Polyphaga
- Infraorder: Cucujiformia
- Family: Cerambycidae
- Genus: Pterolophia
- Species: P. bisbinodula

Binomial name
- Pterolophia bisbinodula (Quedenfeldt, 1883)

Synonyms
- Theticus bisbinodulus Quedenfeldt, 1883

Species of beetle

Pterolophia bisbinodula is a species of beetle in the family Cerambycidae. It was described by Quedenfeldt in 1883, originally under the genus Theticus. It has a wide distribution in Africa.
