= Pterolophia nigroconjuncta =

Scientific classification
- Kingdom: Animalia
- Phylum: Arthropoda
- Clade: Pancrustacea
- Class: Insecta
- Order: Coleoptera
- Suborder: Polyphaga
- Infraorder: Cucujiformia
- Family: Cerambycidae
- Genus: Pterolophia
- Species: P. nigroconjuncta

Binomial name
- Pterolophia nigroconjuncta Breuning & de Jong, 1941

Synonyms
- Pterolophia (Ale) nigroconjuncta Breuning & de Jong, 1941

Species of beetle

Pterolophia nigroconjuncta is a species of beetle in the family Cerambycidae. It was described by Stephan von Breuning and de Jong in 1941.
