= Pterolophia jiriensis =

Scientific classification
- Domain: Eukaryota
- Kingdom: Animalia
- Phylum: Arthropoda
- Class: Insecta
- Order: Coleoptera
- Suborder: Polyphaga
- Infraorder: Cucujiformia
- Family: Cerambycidae
- Tribe: Pteropliini
- Genus: Pterolophia
- Species: P. jiriensis

Binomial name
- Pterolophia jiriensis Danilevsky, 1996

Synonyms
- Pterolophia coreana Hasegawa & Lee, 2000

Species of beetle

Pterolophia jiriensis is a species of beetle in the family Cerambycidae. It was described by Mikhail Leontievich Danilevsky in 1996. It is known from South Korea.
