= Pterolophia pseudocaudata =

Scientific classification
- Kingdom: Animalia
- Phylum: Arthropoda
- Clade: Pancrustacea
- Class: Insecta
- Order: Coleoptera
- Suborder: Polyphaga
- Infraorder: Cucujiformia
- Family: Cerambycidae
- Genus: Pterolophia
- Species: P. pseudocaudata

Binomial name
- Pterolophia pseudocaudata Breuning, 1961

Synonyms
- Theticus caudatus Aurivillius, 1903 nec Bates, 1873

Species of beetle

Pterolophia pseudocaudata is a species of beetle in the family Cerambycidae. It was described by Stephan von Breuning in 1961. It has a wide distribution in Africa.
