= Pterolophia inaequalis =

Scientific classification
- Kingdom: Animalia
- Phylum: Arthropoda
- Clade: Pancrustacea
- Class: Insecta
- Order: Coleoptera
- Suborder: Polyphaga
- Infraorder: Cucujiformia
- Family: Cerambycidae
- Genus: Pterolophia
- Species: P. inaequalis

Binomial name
- Pterolophia inaequalis (Fabricius, 1801)

Synonyms
- Lamia inaequalis Fabricius, 1801; Prionetopsis balteata Thomson, 1864

Species of beetle

Pterolophia inaequalis is a species of beetle in the family Cerambycidae. It was described by Johan Christian Fabricius in 1801. It is known from India.
