= Pterolophia robusta =

Scientific classification
- Kingdom: Animalia
- Phylum: Arthropoda
- Clade: Pancrustacea
- Class: Insecta
- Order: Coleoptera
- Suborder: Polyphaga
- Infraorder: Cucujiformia
- Family: Cerambycidae
- Genus: Pterolophia
- Species: P. robusta

Binomial name
- Pterolophia robusta (Pic, 1928)

Synonyms
- Stesilea robusta Pic, 1928; Pterolophia (Hylobrotus) robusta (Pic, 1928)

Species of beetle

Pterolophia robusta is a species of beetle in the family Cerambycidae. It was described by Maurice Pic in 1928. It is known from Vietnam.
