= Pterolophia circulata =

Scientific classification
- Kingdom: Animalia
- Phylum: Arthropoda
- Clade: Pancrustacea
- Class: Insecta
- Order: Coleoptera
- Suborder: Polyphaga
- Infraorder: Cucujiformia
- Family: Cerambycidae
- Genus: Pterolophia
- Species: P. circulata

Binomial name
- Pterolophia circulata Schwarzer, 1931

Synonyms
- Pterolophia angustelineata Pic, 1934

Species of beetle

Pterolophia circulata is a species of beetle in the family Cerambycidae. It was described by Bernhard Schwarzer in 1931. It is known from Java, Borneo, Malaysia, Sumatra.
