= Pterolophia lichenea =

Scientific classification
- Kingdom: Animalia
- Phylum: Arthropoda
- Clade: Pancrustacea
- Class: Insecta
- Order: Coleoptera
- Suborder: Polyphaga
- Infraorder: Cucujiformia
- Family: Cerambycidae
- Genus: Pterolophia
- Species: P. lichenea

Binomial name
- Pterolophia lichenea Duvivier, 1892

Synonyms
- Pterolophia maynei Lepesme & Breuning, 1956; Pterolophia burgeoni Breuning, 1938

Species of beetle

Pterolophia lichenea is a species of beetle in the family Cerambycidae. It was described by Duvivier in 1892.
