= Pterolophia casta =

Scientific classification
- Domain: Eukaryota
- Kingdom: Animalia
- Phylum: Arthropoda
- Class: Insecta
- Order: Coleoptera
- Suborder: Polyphaga
- Infraorder: Cucujiformia
- Family: Cerambycidae
- Tribe: Pteropliini
- Genus: Pterolophia
- Species: P. casta

Binomial name
- Pterolophia casta (Pascoe, 1875)

Synonyms
- Chaetostigme casta Pascoe, 1875

Species of beetle

Pterolophia casta is a species of beetle in the family Cerambycidae. It was described by Francis Polkinghorne Pascoe in 1875. It is known from Australia.
