= Pterolophia mimica =

Scientific classification
- Domain: Eukaryota
- Kingdom: Animalia
- Phylum: Arthropoda
- Class: Insecta
- Order: Coleoptera
- Suborder: Polyphaga
- Infraorder: Cucujiformia
- Family: Cerambycidae
- Tribe: Pteropliini
- Genus: Pterolophia
- Species: P. mimica

Binomial name
- Pterolophia mimica (Gressitt, 1942)

Synonyms
- Lychrosis mimicus Gressitt, 1942

Species of beetle

Pterolophia mimica is a species of beetle in the family Cerambycidae. It was described by Gressitt in 1942, originally under the genus Lychrosis.
