= Pterolophia principis =

Scientific classification
- Domain: Eukaryota
- Kingdom: Animalia
- Phylum: Arthropoda
- Class: Insecta
- Order: Coleoptera
- Suborder: Polyphaga
- Infraorder: Cucujiformia
- Family: Cerambycidae
- Tribe: Pteropliini
- Genus: Pterolophia
- Species: P. principis

Binomial name
- Pterolophia principis Aurivillius, 1910

Synonyms
- Pterolophia (Principipraonetha) principis Aurivillius, 1910

Species of beetle

Pterolophia principis is a species of beetle in the family Cerambycidae. It was described by Per Olof Christopher Aurivillius in 1910.
