= Pterolophia sordidata =

Scientific classification
- Domain: Eukaryota
- Kingdom: Animalia
- Phylum: Arthropoda
- Class: Insecta
- Order: Coleoptera
- Suborder: Polyphaga
- Infraorder: Cucujiformia
- Family: Cerambycidae
- Tribe: Pteropliini
- Genus: Pterolophia
- Species: P. sordidata

Binomial name
- Pterolophia sordidata Pascoe, 1865

Synonyms
- Pterolophia (Sordidopraonetha) sordidata Pascoe, 1865

Species of beetle

Pterolophia sordidata is a species of beetle in the family Cerambycidae. It was described by Pascoe in 1865.
