= Pterolophia sanghiriensis =

Scientific classification
- Kingdom: Animalia
- Phylum: Arthropoda
- Clade: Pancrustacea
- Class: Insecta
- Order: Coleoptera
- Suborder: Polyphaga
- Infraorder: Cucujiformia
- Family: Cerambycidae
- Genus: Pterolophia
- Species: P. sanghiriensis

Binomial name
- Pterolophia sanghiriensis Breuning, 1970

Synonyms
- Pterolophia (Ale) sanghiriensis Breuning, 1970

Species of beetle

Pterolophia sanghiriensis is a species of beetle in the family Cerambycidae. It was described by Stephan von Breuning in 1970.
