= Pterolophia murina =

Scientific classification
- Domain: Eukaryota
- Kingdom: Animalia
- Phylum: Arthropoda
- Class: Insecta
- Order: Coleoptera
- Suborder: Polyphaga
- Infraorder: Cucujiformia
- Family: Cerambycidae
- Tribe: Pteropliini
- Genus: Pterolophia
- Species: P. murina

Binomial name
- Pterolophia murina (Pascoe, 1859)

Synonyms
- Hathlia murina Pascoe, 1859

Species of beetle

Pterolophia murina is a species of beetle in the family Cerambycidae. It was described by Francis Polkinghorne Pascoe in 1859. It is known from Australia.
