= Pterolophia paracompacta =

Scientific classification
- Kingdom: Animalia
- Phylum: Arthropoda
- Clade: Pancrustacea
- Class: Insecta
- Order: Coleoptera
- Suborder: Polyphaga
- Infraorder: Cucujiformia
- Family: Cerambycidae
- Genus: Pterolophia
- Species: P. paracompacta

Binomial name
- Pterolophia paracompacta Breuning, 1973

Synonyms
- Pterolophia (Hylobrotus) paracompacta Breuning, 1973

Species of beetle

Pterolophia paracompacta is a species of beetle in the family of Cerambycidae. It was first described by Stephan von Breuning in 1973.
