= Pterolophia pseudoprincipis =

Scientific classification
- Kingdom: Animalia
- Phylum: Arthropoda
- Class: Insecta
- Order: Coleoptera
- Suborder: Polyphaga
- Infraorder: Cucujiformia
- Family: Cerambycidae
- Genus: Pterolophia
- Species: P. pseudoprincipis

Binomial name
- Pterolophia pseudoprincipis Breuning, 1943

Synonyms
- Pterolophia (Principipraonetha) pseudoprincipis Breuning, 1943

Species of beetle

Pterolophia pseudoprincipis is a species of beetle in the family Cerambycidae. It was described by Stephan von Breuning in 1943.
