= Pterolophia pulchra =

Scientific classification
- Kingdom: Animalia
- Phylum: Arthropoda
- Clade: Pancrustacea
- Class: Insecta
- Order: Coleoptera
- Suborder: Polyphaga
- Infraorder: Cucujiformia
- Family: Cerambycidae
- Genus: Pterolophia
- Species: P. pulchra

Binomial name
- Pterolophia pulchra Aurivillius, 1921

Synonyms
- Pterolophia (Ale) pulchra Aurivillius, 1921

Species of beetle

Pterolophia pulchra is a species of beetle in the family Cerambycidae. It was described by Per Olof Christopher Aurivillius in 1921.
