= Pterolophia oshimana =

Scientific classification
- Kingdom: Animalia
- Phylum: Arthropoda
- Class: Insecta
- Order: Coleoptera
- Suborder: Polyphaga
- Infraorder: Cucujiformia
- Family: Cerambycidae
- Genus: Pterolophia
- Species: P. oshimana

Binomial name
- Pterolophia oshimana Breuning, 1955

Synonyms
- Ropica nobuoi Breuning & Ohbayashi, 1964; Pseudale oshimana Breuning, 1955

Species of beetle

Pterolophia oshimana is a species of beetle in the family Cerambycidae. It was described by Stephan von Breuning in 1955.
