= Pterolophia dorsotuberculare =

Scientific classification
- Kingdom: Animalia
- Phylum: Arthropoda
- Class: Insecta
- Order: Coleoptera
- Suborder: Polyphaga
- Infraorder: Cucujiformia
- Family: Cerambycidae
- Genus: Pterolophia
- Species: P. dorsotuberculare

Binomial name
- Pterolophia dorsotuberculare Hayashi, 1984

Synonyms
- Pseudale dorsotuberculare Hayashi, 1984

Species of beetle

Pterolophia dorsotuberculare is a species of beetles in the family Cerambycidae. It was described by Japanese Masao Hayashi in 1984.
