= Pterolophia spiniscapus =

Scientific classification
- Kingdom: Animalia
- Phylum: Arthropoda
- Class: Insecta
- Order: Coleoptera
- Suborder: Polyphaga
- Infraorder: Cucujiformia
- Family: Cerambycidae
- Genus: Pterolophia
- Species: P. spiniscapus

Binomial name
- Pterolophia spiniscapus Breuning, 1942

Synonyms
- Mimospiniscapus tonkineus Pic, 1930 nec Pic, 1926

Species of beetle

Pterolophia spiniscapus is a species of beetle in the family Cerambycidae. It was described by Stephan von Breuning in 1942.
