= Pterolophia atrofasciata =

Scientific classification
- Kingdom: Animalia
- Phylum: Arthropoda
- Clade: Pancrustacea
- Class: Insecta
- Order: Coleoptera
- Suborder: Polyphaga
- Infraorder: Cucujiformia
- Family: Cerambycidae
- Genus: Pterolophia
- Species: P. atrofasciata

Binomial name
- Pterolophia atrofasciata (Pic, 1925)

Synonyms
- Stesilea atrofasciata Pic, 1925

Species of beetle

Pterolophia atrofasciata is a species of beetle in the family Cerambycidae. It was described by Maurice Pic in 1925.
