= Pterolophia medioalbicollis =

Scientific classification
- Kingdom: Animalia
- Phylum: Arthropoda
- Clade: Pancrustacea
- Class: Insecta
- Order: Coleoptera
- Suborder: Polyphaga
- Infraorder: Cucujiformia
- Family: Cerambycidae
- Genus: Pterolophia
- Species: P. medioalbicollis

Binomial name
- Pterolophia medioalbicollis Breuning, 1965

Species of beetle

Pterolophia medioalbicollis is a species of beetle in the family Cerambycidae. It was described by Stephan von Breuning in 1965. It is known from Thailand, Borneo and Malaysia.
