= Pterolophia simplicior =

Scientific classification
- Kingdom: Animalia
- Phylum: Arthropoda
- Clade: Pancrustacea
- Class: Insecta
- Order: Coleoptera
- Suborder: Polyphaga
- Infraorder: Cucujiformia
- Family: Cerambycidae
- Genus: Pterolophia
- Species: P. simplicior

Binomial name
- Pterolophia simplicior Breuning, 1961

Synonyms
- Pterolophia (Ale) simplicior Breuning, 1961

Species of beetle

Pterolophia simplicior is a species of beetle in the family Cerambycidae. It was described by Stephan von Breuning in 1961.
