= Pterolophia granulata =

Scientific classification
- Kingdom: Animalia
- Phylum: Arthropoda
- Clade: Pancrustacea
- Class: Insecta
- Order: Coleoptera
- Suborder: Polyphaga
- Infraorder: Cucujiformia
- Family: Cerambycidae
- Genus: Pterolophia
- Species: P. granulata

Binomial name
- Pterolophia granulata (Motschulsky, 1866)

Synonyms
- Pogonocherus granulatus Motschulsky, 1866

Species of beetle

Pterolophia granulata is a species of beetle in the family Cerambycidae. It was described by Victor Motschulsky in 1866.
