= Pterolophia nigrodorsalis =

Scientific classification
- Kingdom: Animalia
- Phylum: Arthropoda
- Clade: Pancrustacea
- Class: Insecta
- Order: Coleoptera
- Suborder: Polyphaga
- Infraorder: Cucujiformia
- Family: Cerambycidae
- Genus: Pterolophia
- Species: P. nigrodorsalis

Binomial name
- Pterolophia nigrodorsalis Breuning & Itzinger, 1943

Species of beetle

Pterolophia nigrodorsalis is a species of beetle in the family Cerambycidae. It was described by Stephan von Breuning and Itzinger in 1943.
