= Pterolophia maacki =

Scientific classification
- Kingdom: Animalia
- Phylum: Arthropoda
- Clade: Pancrustacea
- Class: Insecta
- Order: Coleoptera
- Suborder: Polyphaga
- Infraorder: Cucujiformia
- Family: Cerambycidae
- Genus: Pterolophia
- Species: P. maacki

Binomial name
- Pterolophia maacki Blessig, 1873

Synonyms
- Pterolophia multinotata Pic, 1931

Species of beetle

Pterolophia maacki is a species of beetle in the family Cerambycidae. It was described by Blessig in 1873. It is known from Mongolia.
