= Pterolophia subbicolor =

Scientific classification
- Kingdom: Animalia
- Phylum: Arthropoda
- Class: Insecta
- Order: Coleoptera
- Suborder: Polyphaga
- Infraorder: Cucujiformia
- Family: Cerambycidae
- Genus: Pterolophia
- Species: P. subbicolor

Binomial name
- Pterolophia subbicolor Breuning, 1960

Synonyms
- Pterolophia (Lychrosis) subbicolor Breuning, 1960

Species of beetle

Pterolophia subbicolor is a species of beetle in the family Cerambycidae. It was described by Stephan von Breuning in 1960.
