= Pterolophia albosignata =

Scientific classification
- Kingdom: Animalia
- Phylum: Arthropoda
- Clade: Pancrustacea
- Class: Insecta
- Order: Coleoptera
- Suborder: Polyphaga
- Infraorder: Cucujiformia
- Family: Cerambycidae
- Genus: Pterolophia
- Species: P. albosignata

Binomial name
- Pterolophia albosignata (Blanchard, 1853)

Synonyms
- Prioneta albosignata Blanchard, 1853

Species of beetle

Pterolophia albosignata is a species of beetle in the family Cerambycidae. It was described by Blanchard in 1853.
