= Pterolophia nivea =

Scientific classification
- Kingdom: Animalia
- Phylum: Arthropoda
- Class: Insecta
- Order: Coleoptera
- Suborder: Polyphaga
- Infraorder: Cucujiformia
- Family: Cerambycidae
- Genus: Pterolophia
- Species: P. nivea

Binomial name
- Pterolophia nivea Breuning, 1938

Synonyms
- Pterolophia (Chaetostigme) nivea Breuning, 1938

Species of beetle

Pterolophia nivea is a species of beetle in the family Cerambycidae. It was described by Stephan von Breuning in 1938. It is known from Australia.
