= Pterolophia ropicoides =

Scientific classification
- Kingdom: Animalia
- Phylum: Arthropoda
- Class: Insecta
- Order: Coleoptera
- Suborder: Polyphaga
- Infraorder: Cucujiformia
- Family: Cerambycidae
- Genus: Pterolophia
- Species: P. ropicoides

Binomial name
- Pterolophia ropicoides Breuning, 1968

Synonyms
- Pterolophia (Mimoron) ropicoides Breuning, 1968

Species of beetle

Pterolophia ropicoides is a species of beetle in the family Cerambycidae. It was described by Stephan von Breuning in 1968.
