= Pterolophia parovalis =

Scientific classification
- Kingdom: Animalia
- Phylum: Arthropoda
- Class: Insecta
- Order: Coleoptera
- Suborder: Polyphaga
- Infraorder: Cucujiformia
- Family: Cerambycidae
- Genus: Pterolophia
- Species: P. parovalis

Binomial name
- Pterolophia parovalis Breuning, 1973

Synonyms
- Pterolophia (Pilosipraonetha) parovalis Breuning, 1973

Species of beetle

Pterolophia parovalis is a species of beetle in the family Cerambycidae. It was described by Stephan von Breuning in 1973.
