= Pterolophia pedongana =

Scientific classification
- Kingdom: Animalia
- Phylum: Arthropoda
- Class: Insecta
- Order: Coleoptera
- Suborder: Polyphaga
- Infraorder: Cucujiformia
- Family: Cerambycidae
- Genus: Pterolophia
- Species: P. pedongana

Binomial name
- Pterolophia pedongana Breuning, 1982

Synonyms
- Pterolophia (Armatopraonetha) pedongana Breuning, 1982

Species of beetle

Pterolophia pedongana is a species of beetle in the family Cerambycidae. It was described by Stephan von Breuning in 1982.
