= Pterolophia izumikurana =

Scientific classification
- Kingdom: Animalia
- Phylum: Arthropoda
- Class: Insecta
- Order: Coleoptera
- Suborder: Polyphaga
- Infraorder: Cucujiformia
- Family: Cerambycidae
- Genus: Pterolophia
- Species: P. izumikurana

Binomial name
- Pterolophia izumikurana (Hayashi, 1971)

Synonyms
- Pseudale izumikurana (Hayashi, 1971)

Species of beetle

Pterolophia izumikurana is a species of beetle in the family Cerambycidae. It was described by Masao Hayashi in 1971.
