= Pterolophia koshikijimana =

Scientific classification
- Domain: Eukaryota
- Kingdom: Animalia
- Phylum: Arthropoda
- Class: Insecta
- Order: Coleoptera
- Suborder: Polyphaga
- Infraorder: Cucujiformia
- Family: Cerambycidae
- Tribe: Pteropliini
- Genus: Pterolophia
- Species: P. koshikijimana

Binomial name
- Pterolophia koshikijimana Makihara, 2006

Species of beetle

Pterolophia koshikijimana is a species of beetle in the family Cerambycidae. It was described by Hiroshi Makihara in 2006.
