= Pterolophia dalbergicola =

Scientific classification
- Domain: Eukaryota
- Kingdom: Animalia
- Phylum: Arthropoda
- Class: Insecta
- Order: Coleoptera
- Suborder: Polyphaga
- Infraorder: Cucujiformia
- Family: Cerambycidae
- Tribe: Pteropliini
- Genus: Pterolophia
- Species: P. dalbergicola

Binomial name
- Pterolophia dalbergicola Gressitt, 1951

Species of beetle

Pterolophia dalbergicola is a species of beetle in the family Cerambycidae. It was described by Gressitt in 1951.
