= Pterolophia kusamai =

Scientific classification
- Kingdom: Animalia
- Phylum: Arthropoda
- Clade: Pancrustacea
- Class: Insecta
- Order: Coleoptera
- Suborder: Polyphaga
- Infraorder: Cucujiformia
- Family: Cerambycidae
- Genus: Pterolophia
- Species: P. kusamai

Binomial name
- Pterolophia kusamai Hasegawa & Makihara, 1999

Species of beetle

Pterolophia kusamai is a species of beetle in the family Cerambycidae. It was described by Hasegawa and Hiroshi Makihara in 1999.
