= Pterolophia adachii =

Scientific classification
- Kingdom: Animalia
- Phylum: Arthropoda
- Class: Insecta
- Order: Coleoptera
- Suborder: Polyphaga
- Infraorder: Cucujiformia
- Family: Cerambycidae
- Genus: Pterolophia
- Species: P. adachii

Binomial name
- Pterolophia adachii (Hayashi, 1983)

Synonyms
- Pseudale adachii (Hayashi, 1983)

Species of beetle

Pterolophia adachii is a species of beetle in the family Cerambycidae. It was described by Masao Hayashi in 1983.
