= Pterolophia tsurugiana =

Scientific classification
- Kingdom: Animalia
- Phylum: Arthropoda
- Clade: Pancrustacea
- Class: Insecta
- Order: Coleoptera
- Suborder: Polyphaga
- Infraorder: Cucujiformia
- Family: Cerambycidae
- Genus: Pterolophia
- Species: P. tsurugiana

Binomial name
- Pterolophia tsurugiana (Matsushita, 1934)

Species of beetle

Pterolophia tsurugiana is a species of beetle in the family Cerambycidae. It was described by Masaki Matsushita in 1934.
