= Pterolophia inalbonotata =

Scientific classification
- Kingdom: Animalia
- Phylum: Arthropoda
- Clade: Pancrustacea
- Class: Insecta
- Order: Coleoptera
- Suborder: Polyphaga
- Infraorder: Cucujiformia
- Family: Cerambycidae
- Genus: Pterolophia
- Species: P. inalbonotata

Binomial name
- Pterolophia inalbonotata (Pic, 1945)

Species of beetle

Pterolophia inalbonotata is a species of beetle in the family Cerambycidae. It was described by Maurice Pic in 1945.
