= Pterolophia sanghirica =

Scientific classification
- Kingdom: Animalia
- Phylum: Arthropoda
- Clade: Pancrustacea
- Class: Insecta
- Order: Coleoptera
- Suborder: Polyphaga
- Infraorder: Cucujiformia
- Family: Cerambycidae
- Genus: Pterolophia
- Species: P. sanghirica

Binomial name
- Pterolophia sanghirica Gilmour, 1947

Species of beetle

Pterolophia sanghirica is a species of beetle in the family Cerambycidae. It was described by E. Forrest Gilmour in 1947.
