= Pterolophia concreta =

Scientific classification
- Kingdom: Animalia
- Phylum: Arthropoda
- Clade: Pancrustacea
- Class: Insecta
- Order: Coleoptera
- Suborder: Polyphaga
- Infraorder: Cucujiformia
- Family: Cerambycidae
- Genus: Pterolophia
- Species: P. concreta

Binomial name
- Pterolophia concreta (Pascoe, 1865)

Species of beetle

Pterolophia concreta is a species of beetle in the family Cerambycidae. It was described by Francis Polkinghorne Pascoe in 1865.
