= Pterolophia devittata =

Scientific classification
- Kingdom: Animalia
- Phylum: Arthropoda
- Clade: Pancrustacea
- Class: Insecta
- Order: Coleoptera
- Suborder: Polyphaga
- Infraorder: Cucujiformia
- Family: Cerambycidae
- Genus: Pterolophia
- Species: P. devittata

Binomial name
- Pterolophia devittata Aurivillius, 1927

Species of beetle

Pterolophia devittata is a species of beetle in the family Cerambycidae, which was described by Per Olof Christopher Aurivillius in 1927.
