= Pterolophia sinensis =

Scientific classification
- Kingdom: Animalia
- Phylum: Arthropoda
- Clade: Pancrustacea
- Class: Insecta
- Order: Coleoptera
- Suborder: Polyphaga
- Infraorder: Cucujiformia
- Family: Cerambycidae
- Genus: Pterolophia
- Species: P. sinensis

Binomial name
- Pterolophia sinensis (Fairmaire, 1900)

Species of beetle

Pterolophia sinensis is a species of beetle in the family Cerambycidae. It was described by Léon Fairmaire in 1900.
