= Pterolophia leucoloma =

Scientific classification
- Kingdom: Animalia
- Phylum: Arthropoda
- Clade: Pancrustacea
- Class: Insecta
- Order: Coleoptera
- Suborder: Polyphaga
- Infraorder: Cucujiformia
- Family: Cerambycidae
- Genus: Pterolophia
- Species: P. leucoloma

Binomial name
- Pterolophia leucoloma (Castelnau, 1840)

Species of beetle

Pterolophia leucoloma is a species of beetle in the family Cerambycidae. It was described by Castelnau in 1840.
