= Pterolophia chinensis =

Scientific classification
- Kingdom: Animalia
- Phylum: Arthropoda
- Clade: Pancrustacea
- Class: Insecta
- Order: Coleoptera
- Suborder: Polyphaga
- Infraorder: Cucujiformia
- Family: Cerambycidae
- Genus: Pterolophia
- Species: P. chinensis

Binomial name
- Pterolophia chinensis Breuning, 1982

Species of beetle

Pterolophia chinensis is a species of beetle in the family Cerambycidae. It was described by Stephan von Breuning in 1982.
