= Pterolophia fukiena =

Scientific classification
- Kingdom: Animalia
- Phylum: Arthropoda
- Clade: Pancrustacea
- Class: Insecta
- Order: Coleoptera
- Suborder: Polyphaga
- Infraorder: Cucujiformia
- Family: Cerambycidae
- Genus: Pterolophia
- Species: P. fukiena

Binomial name
- Pterolophia fukiena Gressitt, 1940

Species of beetle

Pterolophia fukiena is a species of beetle in the family Cerambycidae. It was described by Gressitt in 1940.
