= Pterolophia multisignata =

Scientific classification
- Kingdom: Animalia
- Phylum: Arthropoda
- Class: Insecta
- Order: Coleoptera
- Suborder: Polyphaga
- Infraorder: Cucujiformia
- Family: Cerambycidae
- Genus: Pterolophia
- Species: P. multisignata

Binomial name
- Pterolophia multisignata Pic, 1934

Species of beetle

Pterolophia multisignata is a species of beetle in the family Cerambycidae. It was described by Maurice Pic in 1934.
