= Harpalus tichonis =

Scientific classification
- Kingdom: Animalia
- Phylum: Arthropoda
- Class: Insecta
- Order: Coleoptera
- Suborder: Adephaga
- Family: Carabidae
- Genus: Harpalus
- Species: H. tichonis

Binomial name
- Harpalus tichonis Jakobson, 1907

Species of beetle

Harpalus tichonis is a species of ground beetle in the subfamily Harpalinae. It was described by Jakobson in 1907.
