= Harpalus lumbaris =

Scientific classification
- Kingdom: Animalia
- Phylum: Arthropoda
- Class: Insecta
- Order: Coleoptera
- Suborder: Adephaga
- Family: Carabidae
- Genus: Harpalus
- Species: H. lumbaris

Binomial name
- Harpalus lumbaris Mannerheim, 1825

Species of beetle

Harpalus lumbaris is a species of ground beetle in the subfamily Harpalinae. It was described by Mannerheim in 1825.
