= Harpalus rivalsi =

Scientific classification
- Kingdom: Animalia
- Phylum: Arthropoda
- Class: Insecta
- Order: Coleoptera
- Suborder: Adephaga
- Family: Carabidae
- Genus: Harpalus
- Species: H. rivalsi

Binomial name
- Harpalus rivalsi Jeannel, 1948

Species of beetle

Harpalus rivalsi is a species of ground beetle in the subfamily Harpalinae. It was described by Jeannel in 1948.
