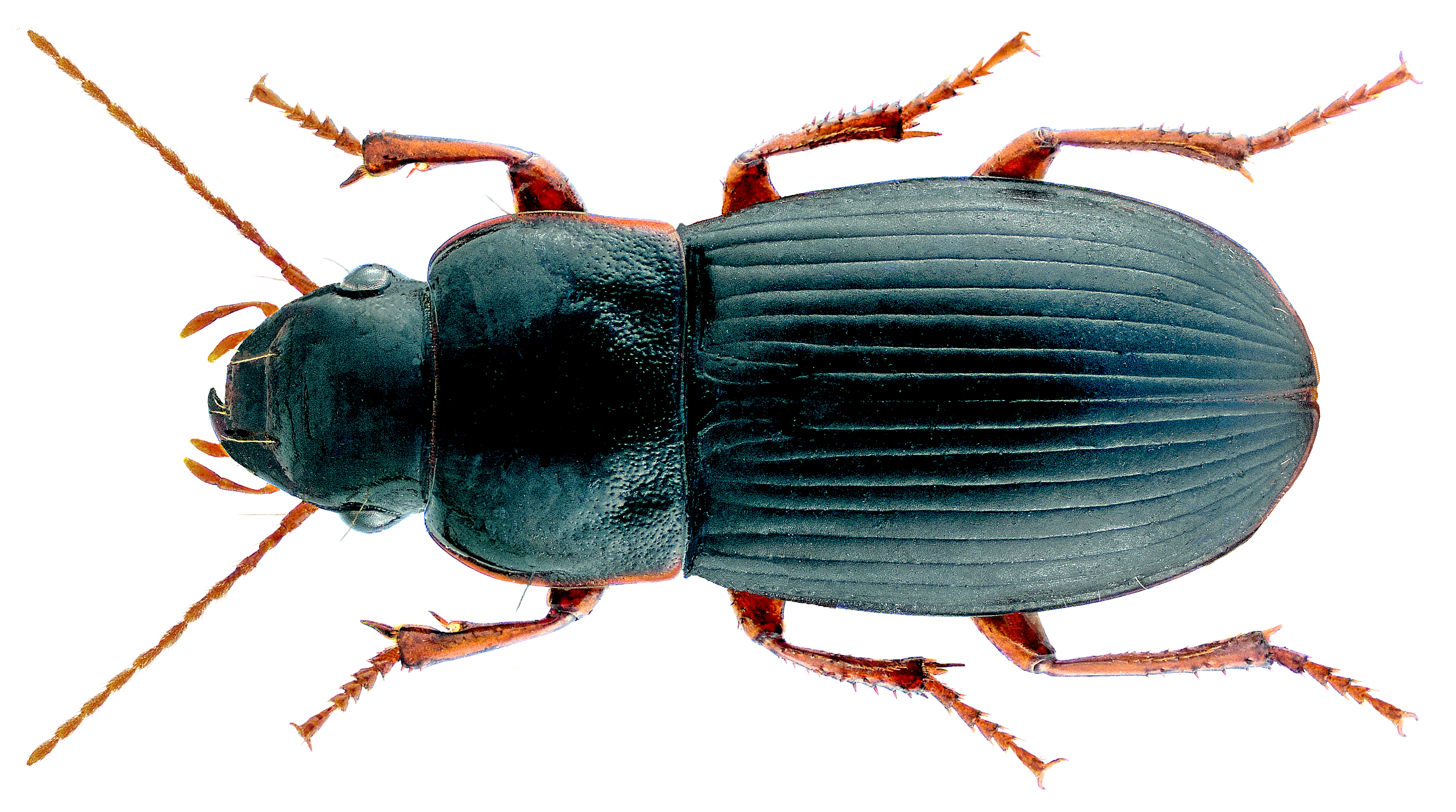
- Harpalus marginellus

Scientific classification
- Kingdom: Animalia
- Phylum: Arthropoda
- Class: Insecta
- Order: Coleoptera
- Suborder: Adephaga
- Family: Carabidae
- Genus: Harpalus
- Subgenus: Harpalus
- Species: H. marginellus

Binomial name
- Harpalus marginellus Dejean, 1829

= Harpalus marginellus =

Species of beetle

Harpalus marginellus is a species of ground beetle that can be found in such countries as Austria, Bulgaria, Czech Republic, Germany, Hungary, Italy, Poland, Slovakia, Switzerland, all states of former Yugoslavia (except for North Macedonia), and southern part of Russia.
