= Harpalus quadratus =

Scientific classification
- Kingdom: Animalia
- Phylum: Arthropoda
- Class: Insecta
- Order: Coleoptera
- Suborder: Adephaga
- Family: Carabidae
- Genus: Harpalus
- Species: H. quadratus

Binomial name
- Harpalus quadratus Chaudoir, 1846

Species of beetle

Harpalus quadratus is a species of ground beetle in the subfamily Harpalinae. It was described by Maximilien Chaudoir in 1846. Its range is reported to cover Asia Minor and the Caucasus, and it lives in mountainous regions (elevation of 1500 to 2500 meters).
