= Harpalus terrestris =

Scientific classification
- Kingdom: Animalia
- Phylum: Arthropoda
- Class: Insecta
- Order: Coleoptera
- Suborder: Adephaga
- Family: Carabidae
- Genus: Harpalus
- Species: H. terrestris

Binomial name
- Harpalus terrestris Motschulsky, 1844

Species of beetle

Harpalus terrestris is a species of ground beetle in the subfamily Harpalinae. It was described by Victor Motschulsky in 1844.
