= Harpalus kaznakovi =

Scientific classification
- Kingdom: Animalia
- Phylum: Arthropoda
- Class: Insecta
- Order: Coleoptera
- Suborder: Adephaga
- Family: Carabidae
- Genus: Harpalus
- Species: H. kaznakovi

Binomial name
- Harpalus kaznakovi Kataev & Wrase, 1997

Species of beetle

Harpalus kaznakovi is a species of ground beetle in the subfamily Harpalinae. It was described by Kataev & Wrase in 1997.
