= Harpalus herbivagus =

Scientific classification
- Kingdom: Animalia
- Phylum: Arthropoda
- Class: Insecta
- Order: Coleoptera
- Suborder: Adephaga
- Family: Carabidae
- Genus: Harpalus
- Species: H. herbivagus

Binomial name
- Harpalus herbivagus Say, 1823

Species of ground beetle

Harpalus herbivagus is a species of ground beetle in the subfamily Harpalinae. It was described by Say in 1823.
