= Harpalus akinini =

Scientific classification
- Kingdom: Animalia
- Phylum: Arthropoda
- Class: Insecta
- Order: Coleoptera
- Suborder: Adephaga
- Family: Carabidae
- Genus: Harpalus
- Species: H. akinini

Binomial name
- Harpalus akinini Tschitscherine, 1895

Species of beetle

Harpalus akinini is a species of ground beetle/ Insect in the subfamily Harpalinae. It was described by Tschitscherine in 1895.
