= Harpalus manas =

Scientific classification
- Kingdom: Animalia
- Phylum: Arthropoda
- Class: Insecta
- Order: Coleoptera
- Suborder: Adephaga
- Family: Carabidae
- Genus: Harpalus
- Species: H. manas

Binomial name
- Harpalus manas Kataev, 1990

Species of beetle

Harpalus manas is a species of ground beetle in the subfamily Harpalinae. It was described by Kataev in 1990.
