= Harpalus semenowi =

Scientific classification
- Kingdom: Animalia
- Phylum: Arthropoda
- Class: Insecta
- Order: Coleoptera
- Suborder: Adephaga
- Family: Carabidae
- Genus: Harpalus
- Species: H. semenowi

Binomial name
- Harpalus semenowi Tschiterscherine, 1901

Species of beetle

Harpalus semenowi is a species of ground beetle in the subfamily Harpalinae. It was described by Tschiterscherine in 1901.
