= Harpalus viridicupreus =

Scientific classification
- Kingdom: Animalia
- Phylum: Arthropoda
- Class: Insecta
- Order: Coleoptera
- Suborder: Adephaga
- Family: Carabidae
- Genus: Harpalus
- Species: H. viridicupreus

Binomial name
- Harpalus viridicupreus Reiche, 1843

Species of beetle

Harpalus viridicupreus is a species of ground beetle in the subfamily Harpalinae. It was described by Reiche in 1843.
