= Harpalus prosperus =

Scientific classification
- Kingdom: Animalia
- Phylum: Arthropoda
- Class: Insecta
- Order: Coleoptera
- Suborder: Adephaga
- Family: Carabidae
- Genus: Harpalus
- Species: H. prosperus

Binomial name
- Harpalus prosperus Basilewsky, 1972

Species of beetle

Harpalus prosperus is a species of ground beetle in the subfamily Harpalinae. It was described by Basilewsky in 1972.
