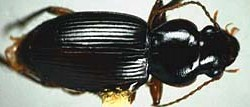
- Harpalus obliquus, USA: Arizona: Pinaleno Mountains

Scientific classification
- Kingdom: Animalia
- Phylum: Arthropoda
- Class: Insecta
- Order: Coleoptera
- Suborder: Adephaga
- Family: Carabidae
- Genus: Harpalus
- Species: H. obliquus

Binomial name
- Harpalus obliquus G.Horn, 1880

Synonyms
- Harpalus regressus

= Harpalus obliquus =

Species of beetle

Harpalus obliquus is a species of ground beetle in the subfamily Harpalinae. It was described by G.Horn in 1880.
