= Harpalus minutulus =

Scientific classification
- Kingdom: Animalia
- Phylum: Arthropoda
- Class: Insecta
- Order: Coleoptera
- Suborder: Adephaga
- Family: Carabidae
- Genus: Harpalus
- Species: H. minutulus

Binomial name
- Harpalus minutulus Kataev & Liang, 2004

Species of beetle

Harpalus minutulus is a species of ground beetle in the subfamily Harpalinae. It was described by Kataev & Liang in 2004.
