= Harpalus saxicola =

Scientific classification
- Kingdom: Animalia
- Phylum: Arthropoda
- Clade: Pancrustacea
- Class: Insecta
- Order: Coleoptera
- Suborder: Adephaga
- Family: Carabidae
- Genus: Harpalus
- Species: H. saxicola

Binomial name
- Harpalus saxicola Dejean, 1829

Synonyms
- Harpalus angulatoides Puel, 1935; Harpalus bosphoranus Reiche, 1862; Harpalus fugax Faldermann, 1836

Species of beetle

Harpalus saxicola is a species of ground beetle native to the Palearctic realm and Near East. In Europe, it can be found in such countries as Albania, Austria, Bulgaria, Greece, Hungary, Moldova, Romania, Slovakia, Slovenia, Sweden, Ukraine, all states of former Yugoslavia (except for Croatia and Slovenia), and southern part of Russia. It is also found in Armenia, Cyprus, Georgia, Iran, Israel, Syria and Turkey.
