= Harpalus flavicornis =

Scientific classification
- Kingdom: Animalia
- Phylum: Arthropoda
- Class: Insecta
- Order: Coleoptera
- Suborder: Adephaga
- Family: Carabidae
- Genus: Harpalus
- Species: H. flavicornis

Binomial name
- Harpalus flavicornis Dejean, 1829

Species of beetle

Harpalus flavicornis is a species of ground beetle in the subfamily Harpalinae. It was first described by Pierre François Marie Auguste Dejean in 1829.
