= Harpalus macronotus =

Scientific classification
- Kingdom: Animalia
- Phylum: Arthropoda
- Class: Insecta
- Order: Coleoptera
- Suborder: Adephaga
- Family: Carabidae
- Genus: Harpalus
- Species: H. macronotus

Binomial name
- Harpalus macronotus Tschitscherine, 1893

Species of beetle

Harpalus macronotus is a species of ground beetle in the subfamily Harpalinae. It was described by Tschitscherine in 1893.
