= Harpalus crates =

Scientific classification
- Kingdom: Animalia
- Phylum: Arthropoda
- Class: Insecta
- Order: Coleoptera
- Suborder: Adephaga
- Family: Carabidae
- Genus: Harpalus
- Species: H. crates

Binomial name
- Harpalus crates Bates, 1883

Species of beetle

Harpalus crates is a species of ground beetle in the subfamily Harpalinae. It was described by Henry Walter Bates in 1883.
