= Harpalus rotundus =

Scientific classification
- Kingdom: Animalia
- Phylum: Arthropoda
- Class: Insecta
- Order: Coleoptera
- Suborder: Adephaga
- Family: Carabidae
- Genus: Harpalus
- Species: H. rotundus

Binomial name
- Harpalus rotundus Facchini, 2003

Species of beetle

Harpalus rotundus is a species of ground beetle in the subfamily Harpalinae. It was described by Facchini in 2003.
