= Harpalus arcuatus =

Scientific classification
- Kingdom: Animalia
- Phylum: Arthropoda
- Class: Insecta
- Order: Coleoptera
- Suborder: Adephaga
- Family: Carabidae
- Genus: Harpalus
- Species: H. arcuatus

Binomial name
- Harpalus arcuatus Tschitscherine, 1898

Species of beetle

Harpalus arcuatus is a species of ground beetle in the subfamily Harpalinae. It was described by Tschitscherine in 1898.
