= Harpalus szalliesi =

Scientific classification
- Kingdom: Animalia
- Phylum: Arthropoda
- Class: Insecta
- Order: Coleoptera
- Suborder: Adephaga
- Family: Carabidae
- Genus: Harpalus
- Species: H. szalliesi

Binomial name
- Harpalus szalliesi Kataev & Wrase, 1995

Species of beetle

Harpalus szalliesi is a species of ground beetle in the subfamily Harpalinae. It was described by Kataev & Wrase in 1995.
