= Harpalus aequicollis =

Scientific classification
- Kingdom: Animalia
- Phylum: Arthropoda
- Class: Insecta
- Order: Coleoptera
- Suborder: Adephaga
- Family: Carabidae
- Genus: Harpalus
- Species: H. aequicollis

Binomial name
- Harpalus aequicollis Motschulsky, 1844

Species of beetle

Harpalus aequicollis is a species of ground beetle in the subfamily Harpalinae. It was described by Victor Motschulsky in 1844.
