= Harpalus apache =

Scientific classification
- Kingdom: Animalia
- Phylum: Arthropoda
- Class: Insecta
- Order: Coleoptera
- Suborder: Adephaga
- Family: Carabidae
- Genus: Harpalus
- Species: H. apache

Binomial name
- Harpalus apache Kataev, 2010

Species of beetle

Harpalus apache is a species of ground beetle in the subfamily Harpalinae. It was described by Kataev in 2010.
