= Harpalus yinchuanensis =

Scientific classification
- Kingdom: Animalia
- Phylum: Arthropoda
- Class: Insecta
- Order: Coleoptera
- Suborder: Adephaga
- Family: Carabidae
- Genus: Harpalus
- Species: H. yinchuanensis

Binomial name
- Harpalus yinchuanensis Huang, 1993

Species of beetle

Harpalus yinchuanensis is a species of ground beetle in the subfamily Harpalinae. It was described by Huang in 1993.
