= Harpalus giacomazzoi =

Scientific classification
- Kingdom: Animalia
- Phylum: Arthropoda
- Class: Insecta
- Order: Coleoptera
- Suborder: Adephaga
- Family: Carabidae
- Genus: Harpalus
- Species: H. giacomazzoi

Binomial name
- Harpalus giacomazzoi Kataev & Wrase, 1996

Species of beetle

Harpalus giacomazzoi is a species of ground beetle in the subfamily Harpalinae. It was described by Kataev & Wrase in 1996 and is endemic to Sichuan, China.

== Description ==
The species is 8.4–8.8 millimetres (0.33–0.35 in) long by 3.6–3.7 millimetres (0.14–0.15 in) wide but can be 10.2–10.6 millimetres (0.40–0.42 in) long by 4.4–4.6 millimetres (0.17–0.18 in) wide. Both antenna and palpi are brownish-yellow in colour with black head and dark brown or black tibiae.
