= Harpalus badakschanus =

Scientific classification
- Kingdom: Animalia
- Phylum: Arthropoda
- Class: Insecta
- Order: Coleoptera
- Suborder: Adephaga
- Family: Carabidae
- Genus: Harpalus
- Species: H. badakschanus

Binomial name
- Harpalus badakschanus Jedlicka, 1956

Species of beetle

Harpalus badakschanus is a species of ground beetle in the subfamily Harpalinae. It was described by Jedlicka in 1956.
