= Harpalus caiphus =

Scientific classification
- Kingdom: Animalia
- Phylum: Arthropoda
- Class: Insecta
- Order: Coleoptera
- Suborder: Adephaga
- Family: Carabidae
- Genus: Harpalus
- Species: H. caiphus

Binomial name
- Harpalus caiphus Reiche & Saulcy, 1855

Species of beetle

Harpalus caiphus is a species of ground beetle in the subfamily Harpalinae. It was described by Reiche & Saulcy in 1855.
