= Harpalus nevadensis =

Scientific classification
- Kingdom: Animalia
- Phylum: Arthropoda
- Class: Insecta
- Order: Coleoptera
- Suborder: Adephaga
- Family: Carabidae
- Genus: Harpalus
- Species: H. nevadensis

Binomial name
- Harpalus nevadensis K. Daniel & J. Daniel, 1898

Species of beetle

Harpalus nevadensis is a species of ground beetle in the subfamily Harpalinae. It was described by K. Daniel & J. Daniel in 1898.
