= Harpalus fokienensis =

Scientific classification
- Kingdom: Animalia
- Phylum: Arthropoda
- Class: Insecta
- Order: Coleoptera
- Suborder: Adephaga
- Family: Carabidae
- Genus: Harpalus
- Species: H. fokienensis

Binomial name
- Harpalus fokienensis Schauberger, 1930

Species of beetle

Harpalus fokienensis is a species of ground beetle in the subfamily Harpalinae. It was described by Schauberger in 1930.
