= Harpalus fulvicornis =

Scientific classification
- Kingdom: Animalia
- Phylum: Arthropoda
- Class: Insecta
- Order: Coleoptera
- Suborder: Adephaga
- Family: Carabidae
- Genus: Harpalus
- Species: H. fulvicornis

Binomial name
- Harpalus fulvicornis Thunberg, 1806

Species of beetle

Harpalus fulvicornis is a species of ground beetle in the subfamily Harpalinae. It was described by Thunberg in 1806.
