= Harpalus triseriatus =

Scientific classification
- Kingdom: Animalia
- Phylum: Arthropoda
- Class: Insecta
- Order: Coleoptera
- Suborder: Adephaga
- Family: Carabidae
- Genus: Harpalus
- Species: H. triseriatus

Binomial name
- Harpalus triseriatus A. Fleischer, 1897

Species of beetle

Harpalus triseriatus is a species of ground beetle in the subfamily Harpalinae. It was described by A. Fleischer in 1897.
