= Harpalus franzi =

Scientific classification
- Kingdom: Animalia
- Phylum: Arthropoda
- Class: Insecta
- Order: Coleoptera
- Suborder: Adephaga
- Family: Carabidae
- Genus: Harpalus
- Species: H. franzi

Binomial name
- Harpalus franzi Mateu, 1954

Species of beetle

Harpalus franzi is a species of ground beetle in the subfamily Harpalinae. It was described by Mateu in 1954.
