= Harpalus suensoni =

Scientific classification
- Kingdom: Animalia
- Phylum: Arthropoda
- Class: Insecta
- Order: Coleoptera
- Suborder: Adephaga
- Family: Carabidae
- Genus: Harpalus
- Species: H. suensoni

Binomial name
- Harpalus suensoni Kataev, 1997

Species of beetle

Harpalus suensoni is a species of ground beetle in the subfamily Harpalinae. It was described by Boris Mikhailovich Kataev in 1997.
