= Harpalus turmalinus =

Scientific classification
- Kingdom: Animalia
- Phylum: Arthropoda
- Class: Insecta
- Order: Coleoptera
- Suborder: Adephaga
- Family: Carabidae
- Genus: Harpalus
- Species: H. turmalinus

Binomial name
- Harpalus turmalinus Erichson, 1847

Species of beetle

Harpalus turmalinus is a species of ground beetle in the subfamily Harpalinae. It was described by Wilhelm Ferdinand Erichson in 1847.
