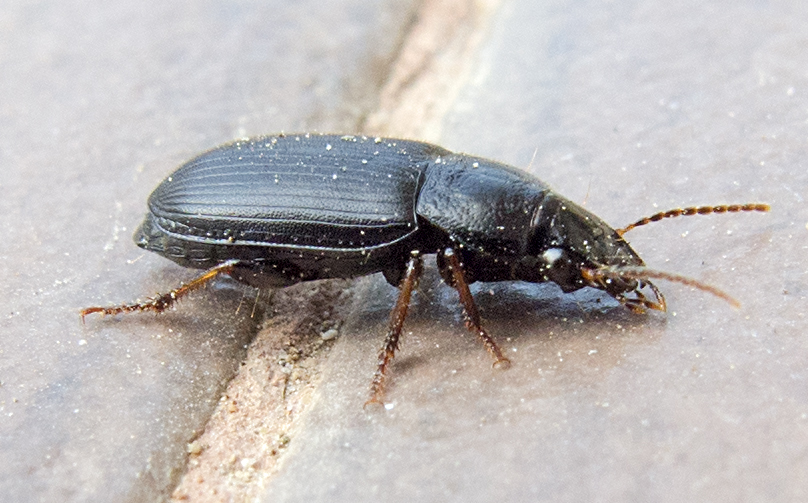

Scientific classification
- Kingdom: Animalia
- Phylum: Arthropoda
- Class: Insecta
- Order: Coleoptera
- Suborder: Adephaga
- Family: Carabidae
- Genus: Harpalus
- Species: H. signaticornis

Binomial name
- Harpalus signaticornis (Duftschmid, 1812)

= Harpalus signaticornis =

Species of beetle

Harpalus signaticornis is a species of ground beetle in the subfamily Harpalinae. It was described by Duftschmid in 1812.
