= Harpalus turcicus =

Scientific classification
- Kingdom: Animalia
- Phylum: Arthropoda
- Class: Insecta
- Order: Coleoptera
- Suborder: Adephaga
- Family: Carabidae
- Genus: Harpalus
- Species: H. turcicus

Binomial name
- Harpalus turcicus Jedlicka, 1958

Species of beetle

Harpalus turcicus is a species of ground beetle in the subfamily Harpalinae. It was described by Jedlicka in 1958.
