= Harpalus martini =

Scientific classification
- Kingdom: Animalia
- Phylum: Arthropoda
- Class: Insecta
- Order: Coleoptera
- Suborder: Adephaga
- Family: Carabidae
- Genus: Harpalus
- Species: H. martini

Binomial name
- Harpalus martini Vandyke, 1926

Species of beetle

Harpalus martini is a species of ground beetle in the subfamily Harpalinae. It was described by Vandyke in 1926.
