= Harpalus gisellae =

Scientific classification
- Kingdom: Animalia
- Phylum: Arthropoda
- Class: Insecta
- Order: Coleoptera
- Suborder: Adephaga
- Family: Carabidae
- Genus: Harpalus
- Species: H. gisellae

Binomial name
- Harpalus gisellae Csiki, 1932

Species of insect

Harpalus gisellae is a species of ground beetle in the subfamily Harpalinae. It was described by Csiki in 1932.
