= Harpalus cordifer =

Scientific classification
- Kingdom: Animalia
- Phylum: Arthropoda
- Class: Insecta
- Order: Coleoptera
- Suborder: Adephaga
- Family: Carabidae
- Genus: Harpalus
- Species: H. cordifer

Binomial name
- Harpalus cordifer Notman, 1919

Species of beetle

Harpalus cordifer is a species of ground beetle in the subfamily Harpalinae. It was described by Notman in 1919.
