= Harpalus obnixus =

Scientific classification
- Kingdom: Animalia
- Phylum: Arthropoda
- Class: Insecta
- Order: Coleoptera
- Suborder: Adephaga
- Family: Carabidae
- Genus: Harpalus
- Species: H. obnixus

Binomial name
- Harpalus obnixus Casey, 1924

Species of beetle

Harpalus obnixus is a species of ground beetle in the subfamily Harpalinae. It was described by Casey in 1924.
