= Harpalus pseudotinctulus =

Scientific classification
- Kingdom: Animalia
- Phylum: Arthropoda
- Class: Insecta
- Order: Coleoptera
- Suborder: Adephaga
- Family: Carabidae
- Genus: Harpalus
- Species: H. pseudotinctulus

Binomial name
- Harpalus pseudotinctulus Schauberger, 1932

Species of beetle

Harpalus pseudotinctulus is a species of ground beetle in the subfamily Harpalinae. It was described by Schauberger in 1932.
