= Harpalus lederi =

Scientific classification
- Kingdom: Animalia
- Phylum: Arthropoda
- Class: Insecta
- Order: Coleoptera
- Suborder: Adephaga
- Family: Carabidae
- Genus: Harpalus
- Species: H. lederi

Binomial name
- Harpalus lederi Tschitscherne, 1899

Species of beetle

Harpalus lederi is a species of ground beetle in the subfamily Harpalinae. It was described by Tschitscherne in 1899.
