= Harpalus plenalis =

Scientific classification
- Kingdom: Animalia
- Phylum: Arthropoda
- Class: Insecta
- Order: Coleoptera
- Suborder: Adephaga
- Family: Carabidae
- Genus: Harpalus
- Species: H. plenalis

Binomial name
- Harpalus plenalis Casey, 1914

Species of beetle

Harpalus plenalis is a species of ground beetle in the subfamily Harpalinae. It was described by Casey in 1914.

== Distribution ==
Within the United States of America and Canada.
