= Harpalus silipes =

Scientific classification
- Kingdom: Animalia
- Phylum: Arthropoda
- Class: Insecta
- Order: Coleoptera
- Suborder: Adephaga
- Family: Carabidae
- Genus: Harpalus
- Species: H. silipes

Binomial name
- Harpalus silipes Dejean, 1831

Species of beetle

Harpalus silipes is a species of ground beetle belonging to the subfamily Harpalinae. It was described by Pierre François Marie Auguste Dejean in 1831.
