= Harpalus chobautianus =

Scientific classification
- Kingdom: Animalia
- Phylum: Arthropoda
- Class: Insecta
- Order: Coleoptera
- Suborder: Adephaga
- Family: Carabidae
- Genus: Harpalus
- Species: H. chobautianus

Binomial name
- Harpalus chobautianus Lutshnik, 1922

Species of beetle

Harpalus chobautianus is a species of ground beetle in the subfamily Harpalinae. It was described by Lutshnik in 1922.
