= Harpalus cephalotes =

Scientific classification
- Kingdom: Animalia
- Phylum: Arthropoda
- Class: Insecta
- Order: Coleoptera
- Suborder: Adephaga
- Family: Carabidae
- Genus: Harpalus
- Species: H. cephalotes

Binomial name
- Harpalus cephalotes Fairmaire & Laboulbene, 1854

Species of beetle

Harpalus cephalotes is a species of ground beetle in the subfamily Harpalinae. It was described by Fairmaire & Laboulbene in 1854. It thrives in both high-temperature areas and highly saline soils. It is the only member of the cephalotes subgenus. It has two subspecies: H. c. cephalotes, found across south-central Europe east to Kazakhstan and the Turkey/Transcaucasus region; and H. c. somcheticus, found in dry parts of eastern Anatolia, Armenia, and Israel.
