= Harpalus impressus =

Scientific classification
- Kingdom: Animalia
- Phylum: Arthropoda
- Class: Insecta
- Order: Coleoptera
- Suborder: Adephaga
- Family: Carabidae
- Genus: Harpalus
- Species: H. impressus

Binomial name
- Harpalus impressus Roth, 1851

Species of beetle

Harpalus impressus is a species of ground beetle in the subfamily Harpalinae. It was described by Roth in 1851.
