= Harpalus kadyrbekovi =

Scientific classification
- Kingdom: Animalia
- Phylum: Arthropoda
- Class: Insecta
- Order: Coleoptera
- Suborder: Adephaga
- Family: Carabidae
- Genus: Harpalus
- Species: H. kadyrbekovi

Binomial name
- Harpalus kadyrbekovi Kataev, 1988

Species of beetle

Harpalus kadyrbekovi is a species of ground beetle in the subfamily Harpalinae. It was described by Kataev in 1988.
