= Harpalus animosus =

Scientific classification
- Kingdom: Animalia
- Phylum: Arthropoda
- Class: Insecta
- Order: Coleoptera
- Suborder: Adephaga
- Family: Carabidae
- Genus: Harpalus
- Species: H. animosus

Binomial name
- Harpalus animosus Casey, 1924

Species of beetle

Harpalus animosus is a species of ground beetle in the subfamily Harpalinae. It was described by Thomas Lincoln Casey Jr. in 1924.
