= Harpalus mitridati =

Scientific classification
- Kingdom: Animalia
- Phylum: Arthropoda
- Class: Insecta
- Order: Coleoptera
- Suborder: Adephaga
- Family: Carabidae
- Genus: Harpalus
- Species: H. mitridati

Binomial name
- Harpalus mitridati Pliginskiy, 1915

Species of beetle

Harpalus mitridati is a species of ground beetle in the subfamily Harpalinae. It was described by Pliginskiy in 1915.
