= Harpalus baleensis =

Scientific classification
- Kingdom: Animalia
- Phylum: Arthropoda
- Class: Insecta
- Order: Coleoptera
- Suborder: Adephaga
- Family: Carabidae
- Genus: Harpalus
- Species: H. baleensis

Binomial name
- Harpalus baleensis Clarke, 1973

Species of beetle

Harpalus baleensis is a species of ground beetle in the subfamily Harpalinae. It was described by Clarke in 1973.
