= Harpalus procognatus =

Scientific classification
- Kingdom: Animalia
- Phylum: Arthropoda
- Class: Insecta
- Order: Coleoptera
- Suborder: Adephaga
- Family: Carabidae
- Genus: Harpalus
- Species: H. procognatus

Binomial name
- Harpalus procognatus Lorenz, 1998

Species of beetle

Harpalus procognatus is a species of ground beetle in the subfamily Harpalinae. It was described by Lorenz in 1998.
