= Harpalus hospes =

Scientific classification
- Kingdom: Animalia
- Phylum: Arthropoda
- Clade: Pancrustacea
- Class: Insecta
- Order: Coleoptera
- Suborder: Adephaga
- Family: Carabidae
- Genus: Harpalus
- Species: H. hospes

Binomial name
- Harpalus hospes Sturm, 1818

Synonyms
- Harpalophonus hospes; Harpalus sturmii Dejean, 1829

Species of beetle

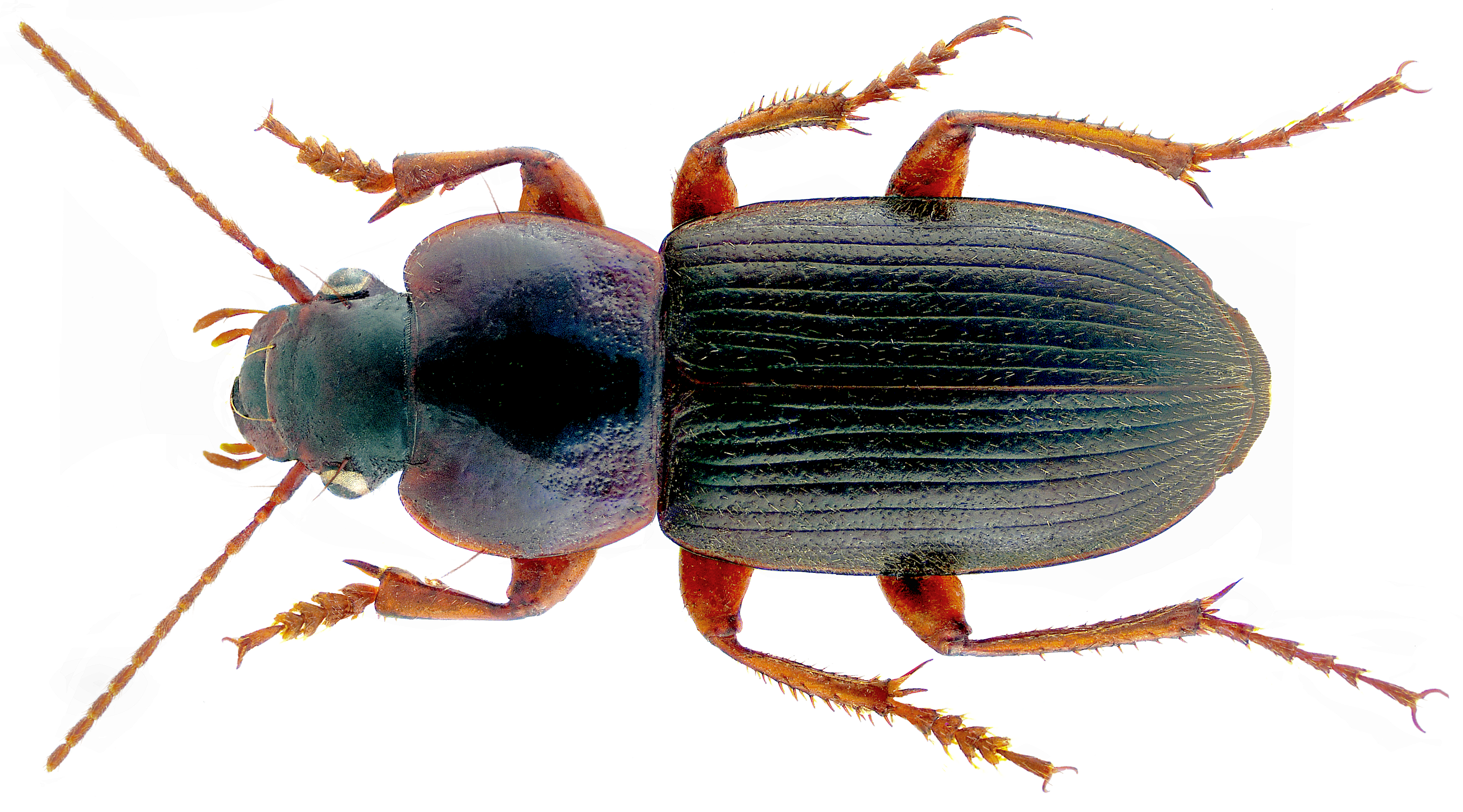
Harpalus hospes armenus Daniel, 1904

Harpalus hospes is a species of ground beetle native to Europe, where it can be found in such countries as Austria, Bulgaria, Czech Republic, Greece, Hungary, Moldova, Romania, Slovakia, Slovenia, Ukraine and southern part of Russia. It is also found in such Asian countries as Armenia, Georgia, Iran, Turkey and Uzbekistan.
