= Harpalus dissitus =

Scientific classification
- Kingdom: Animalia
- Phylum: Arthropoda
- Class: Insecta
- Order: Coleoptera
- Suborder: Adephaga
- Family: Carabidae
- Genus: Harpalus
- Species: H. dissitus

Binomial name
- Harpalus dissitus Antoine, 1931

Species of beetle

Harpalus dissitus is a species of ground beetle in the subfamily Harpalinae. It was described by Antoine in 1931.
