= Harpalus capito =

Scientific classification
- Kingdom: Animalia
- Phylum: Arthropoda
- Class: Insecta
- Order: Coleoptera
- Suborder: Adephaga
- Family: Carabidae
- Genus: Harpalus
- Species: H. capito

Binomial name
- Harpalus capito A.Morawitz, 1862

Species of beetle

Harpalus capito is a species of ground beetle in the subfamily Harpalinae. It was described by A.Morawitz in 1862.
