= Harpalus tridens =

Scientific classification
- Kingdom: Animalia
- Phylum: Arthropoda
- Class: Insecta
- Order: Coleoptera
- Suborder: Adephaga
- Family: Carabidae
- Genus: Harpalus
- Species: H. tridens

Binomial name
- Harpalus tridens A.Morawitz, 1862

Species of beetle

Harpalus tridens is a species of ground beetle in the subfamily Harpalinae. It was described by A.Morawitz in 1862.
