= Harpalus spurius =

Scientific classification
- Kingdom: Animalia
- Phylum: Arthropoda
- Class: Insecta
- Order: Coleoptera
- Suborder: Adephaga
- Family: Carabidae
- Genus: Harpalus
- Species: H. spurius

Binomial name
- Harpalus spurius Peringuey, 1896

Species of beetle

Harpalus spurius is a species of ground beetle in the subfamily Harpalinae. It was described by Peringuey in 1896.
