= Harpalus laetus =

Scientific classification
- Kingdom: Animalia
- Phylum: Arthropoda
- Class: Insecta
- Order: Coleoptera
- Suborder: Adephaga
- Family: Carabidae
- Genus: Harpalus
- Species: H. laetus

Binomial name
- Harpalus laetus Reiche, 1843

Species of beetle

Harpalus laetus is a species of ground beetle in the subfamily Harpalinae. It was described by Reiche in 1843.
