= Harpalus jureceki =

Scientific classification
- Kingdom: Animalia
- Phylum: Arthropoda
- Class: Insecta
- Order: Coleoptera
- Suborder: Adephaga
- Family: Carabidae
- Genus: Harpalus
- Species: H. jureceki

Binomial name
- Harpalus jureceki (Jedlicka, 1928)

Species of beetle

Harpalus jureceki is a species of ground beetle in the subfamily Harpalinae. It was described by Jedlicka in 1928.
