= Harpalus coreanus =

Scientific classification
- Kingdom: Animalia
- Phylum: Arthropoda
- Class: Insecta
- Order: Coleoptera
- Suborder: Adephaga
- Family: Carabidae
- Genus: Harpalus
- Species: H. coreanus

Binomial name
- Harpalus coreanus (Tschitscherine, 1895)

Species of beetle

Harpalus coreanus is a species of ground beetle in the subfamily Harpalinae. It was described by Tschitscherine in 1895.
