= Harpalus jordanus =

Scientific classification
- Kingdom: Animalia
- Phylum: Arthropoda
- Class: Insecta
- Order: Coleoptera
- Suborder: Adephaga
- Family: Carabidae
- Genus: Harpalus
- Species: H. jordanus

Binomial name
- Harpalus jordanus Jedlicka, 1964

Species of beetle

Harpalus jordanus is a species of ground beetle in the subfamily Harpalinae. It was described by Jedlicka in 1964.
