= Harpalus kazanensis =

Scientific classification
- Kingdom: Animalia
- Phylum: Arthropoda
- Class: Insecta
- Order: Coleoptera
- Suborder: Adephaga
- Family: Carabidae
- Genus: Harpalus
- Species: H. kazanensis

Binomial name
- Harpalus kazanensis Jedlicka, 1958

Species of beetle

Harpalus kazanensis is a species of ground beetle in the subfamily Harpalinae. It was described by Jedlicka in 1958.
