= Harpalus autumnalis =

Scientific classification
- Kingdom: Animalia
- Phylum: Arthropoda
- Class: Insecta
- Order: Coleoptera
- Suborder: Adephaga
- Family: Carabidae
- Genus: Harpalus
- Species: H. autumnalis

Binomial name
- Harpalus autumnalis Duftschmid, 1812

Species of beetle

Harpalus autumnalis is a species of ground beetle in the subfamily Harpalinae. It was described by Duftschmid in 1812.
