= Harpalus microthorax =

Scientific classification
- Kingdom: Animalia
- Phylum: Arthropoda
- Class: Insecta
- Order: Coleoptera
- Suborder: Adephaga
- Family: Carabidae
- Genus: Harpalus
- Species: H. microthorax

Binomial name
- Harpalus microthorax Motschulsky, 1849

Species of beetle

Harpalus microthorax is a species of ground beetle in the subfamily Harpalinae. It was described by Victor Motschulsky in 1849.
