= Harpalus kibonoti =

Scientific classification
- Kingdom: Animalia
- Phylum: Arthropoda
- Class: Insecta
- Order: Coleoptera
- Suborder: Adephaga
- Family: Carabidae
- Genus: Harpalus
- Species: H. kibonoti

Binomial name
- Harpalus kibonoti Alluaud, 1926

Species of beetle

Harpalus kibonoti is a species of ground beetle in the subfamily Harpalinae. It was described by Alluaud in 1926.
