= Harpalus atratus =

Scientific classification
- Kingdom: Animalia
- Phylum: Arthropoda
- Class: Insecta
- Order: Coleoptera
- Suborder: Adephaga
- Family: Carabidae
- Genus: Harpalus
- Species: H. atratus

Binomial name
- Harpalus atratus Latrellie, 1804

Species of beetle

Harpalus atratus is a species of ground beetle in the subfamily Harpalinae. It was described by Latrellie in 1804.
