= Harpalus picipennis =

Scientific classification
- Kingdom: Animalia
- Phylum: Arthropoda
- Class: Insecta
- Order: Coleoptera
- Suborder: Adephaga
- Family: Carabidae
- Genus: Harpalus
- Species: H. picipennis

Binomial name
- Harpalus picipennis Duftschmid, 1812

Species of beetle

Harpalus picipennis is a species of ground beetle in the subfamily Harpalinae. It was described by Duftschmid in 1812.
