= Harpalus poncei =

Scientific classification
- Kingdom: Animalia
- Phylum: Arthropoda
- Class: Insecta
- Order: Coleoptera
- Suborder: Adephaga
- Family: Carabidae
- Genus: Harpalus
- Species: H. poncei

Binomial name
- Harpalus poncei Will, 2001

Species of beetle

Harpalus poncei is a species of ground beetle in the subfamily Harpalinae. It was described by Will in 2001.
