= Harpalus brachypterus =

Scientific classification
- Kingdom: Animalia
- Phylum: Arthropoda
- Class: Insecta
- Order: Coleoptera
- Suborder: Adephaga
- Family: Carabidae
- Genus: Harpalus
- Species: H. brachypterus

Binomial name
- Harpalus brachypterus Tschitcherine, 1898

Species of beetle

Harpalus brachypterus is a species of ground beetle in the subfamily Harpalinae. It was described by Tschitcherine in 1898.
