= Harpalus corpulentus =

Scientific classification
- Kingdom: Animalia
- Phylum: Arthropoda
- Class: Insecta
- Order: Coleoptera
- Suborder: Adephaga
- Family: Carabidae
- Genus: Harpalus
- Species: H. corpulentus

Binomial name
- Harpalus corpulentus (Casey, 1914)

Species of beetle

Harpalus corpulentus is a species of ground beetle in the subfamily Harpalinae. It was described by Casey in 1914.
