= Harpalus longipalmatus =

Scientific classification
- Kingdom: Animalia
- Phylum: Arthropoda
- Class: Insecta
- Order: Coleoptera
- Suborder: Adephaga
- Family: Carabidae
- Genus: Harpalus
- Species: H. longipalmatus

Binomial name
- Harpalus longipalmatus Mordkovitsh, 1969

Species of beetle

Harpalus longipalmatus is a species of ground beetle in the subfamily Harpalinae. It was described by Mordkovitsh in 1969.
