= Harpalus janinae =

Scientific classification
- Kingdom: Animalia
- Phylum: Arthropoda
- Class: Insecta
- Order: Coleoptera
- Suborder: Adephaga
- Family: Carabidae
- Genus: Harpalus
- Species: H. janinae

Binomial name
- Harpalus janinae Jeanne, 1984

Species of beetle

Harpalus janinae is a species of ground beetle in the subfamily Harpalinae. It was described by Jeanne in 1984.
