= Harpalus karamani =

Scientific classification
- Kingdom: Animalia
- Phylum: Arthropoda
- Class: Insecta
- Order: Coleoptera
- Suborder: Adephaga
- Family: Carabidae
- Genus: Harpalus
- Species: H. karamani

Binomial name
- Harpalus karamani Apfelbeck, 1902

Species of beetle

Harpalus karamani is a species of ground beetle in the subfamily Harpalinae. It was described by Apfelbeck in 1902.
