= Harpalus nigritarsis =

Scientific classification
- Kingdom: Animalia
- Phylum: Arthropoda
- Class: Insecta
- Order: Coleoptera
- Suborder: Adephaga
- Family: Carabidae
- Genus: Harpalus
- Species: H. nigritarsis

Binomial name
- Harpalus nigritarsis C.R. Sahlberg, 1827

Species of beetle

Harpalus nigritarsis is a species of ground beetle in the subfamily Harpalinae. It was described by C.R. Sahlberg in 1827.
