= Harpalus kmecoi =

Scientific classification
- Kingdom: Animalia
- Phylum: Arthropoda
- Class: Insecta
- Order: Coleoptera
- Suborder: Adephaga
- Family: Carabidae
- Genus: Harpalus
- Species: H. kmecoi

Binomial name
- Harpalus kmecoi Facchini, 2003

Species of beetle

Harpalus kmecoi is a species of ground beetle in the subfamily Harpalinae. It was described by Facchini in 2003.
