= Harpalus frater =

Scientific classification
- Kingdom: Animalia
- Phylum: Arthropoda
- Class: Insecta
- Order: Coleoptera
- Suborder: Adephaga
- Family: Carabidae
- Genus: Harpalus
- Species: H. frater

Binomial name
- Harpalus frater Chaudoir, 1876

Species of beetle

Harpalus frater is a species of ground beetle in the subfamily Harpalinae. It was described by Chaudoir in 1876.
