= Harpalus anisodactyliformis =

Scientific classification
- Kingdom: Animalia
- Phylum: Arthropoda
- Class: Insecta
- Order: Coleoptera
- Suborder: Adephaga
- Family: Carabidae
- Genus: Harpalus
- Species: H. anisodactyliformis

Binomial name
- Harpalus anisodactyliformis Solsky, 1874

Species of beetle

Harpalus anisodactyliformis is a species of ground beetle in the subfamily Harpalinae. It was described by Solsky in 1874.
