= Harpalus opacipennis =

Scientific classification
- Kingdom: Animalia
- Phylum: Arthropoda
- Class: Insecta
- Order: Coleoptera
- Suborder: Adephaga
- Family: Carabidae
- Genus: Harpalus
- Species: H. opacipennis

Binomial name
- Harpalus opacipennis (Haldemann, 1843)

Species of beetle

Harpalus opacipennis is a species of ground beetle in the subfamily Harpalinae. It was described by Haldemann in 1843.
