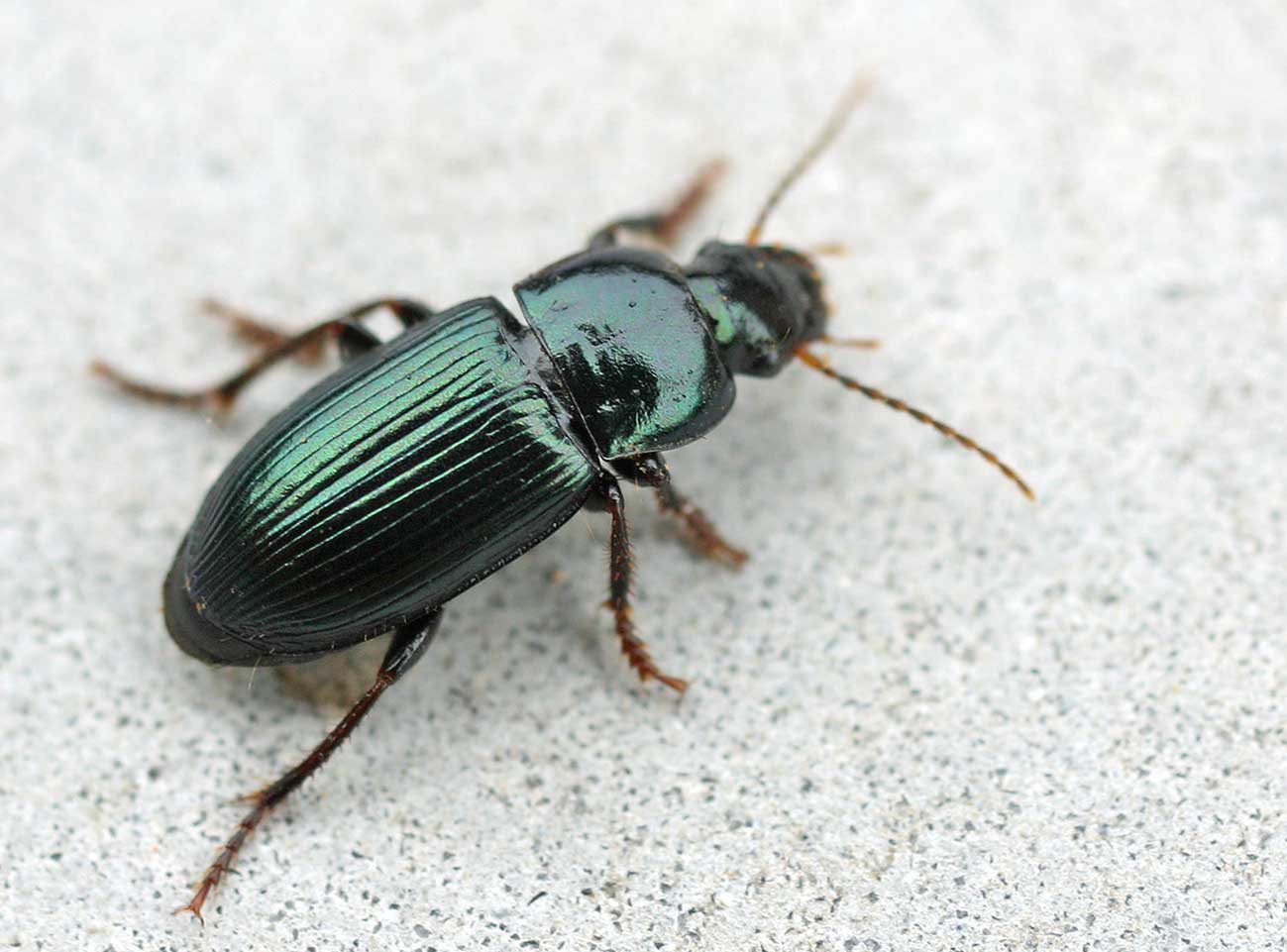
- Harpalus affinis

Scientific classification
- Kingdom: Animalia
- Phylum: Arthropoda
- Class: Insecta
- Order: Coleoptera
- Suborder: Adephaga
- Family: Carabidae
- Tribe: Harpalini
- Genus: Harpalus; Latreille, 1802

Synonyms
- Harpalellus Lindroth, 1968; Harpalobrachys; Pseudoophonus Motschoulsky, 1844

= Harpalus (beetle) =

Genus of beetles

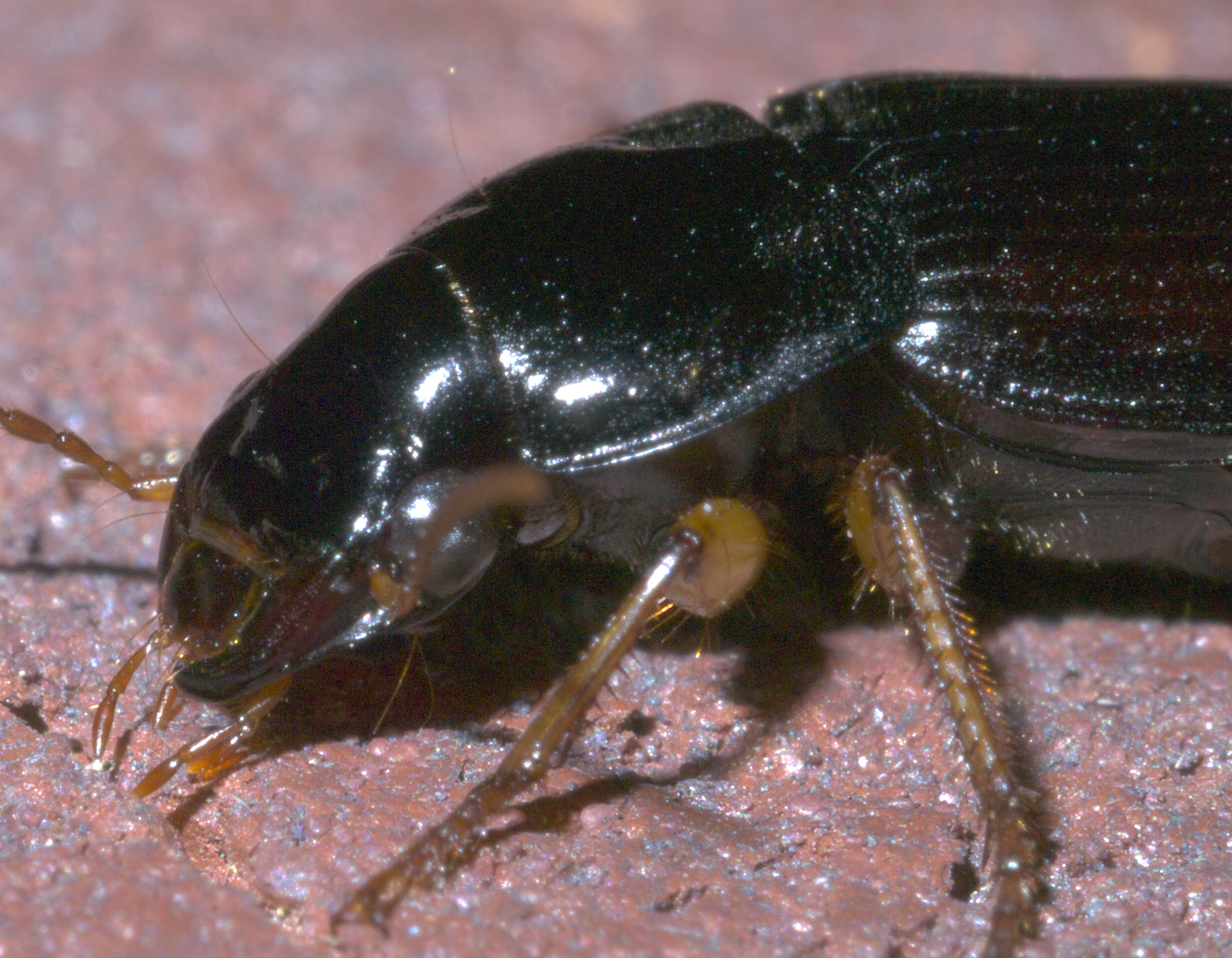

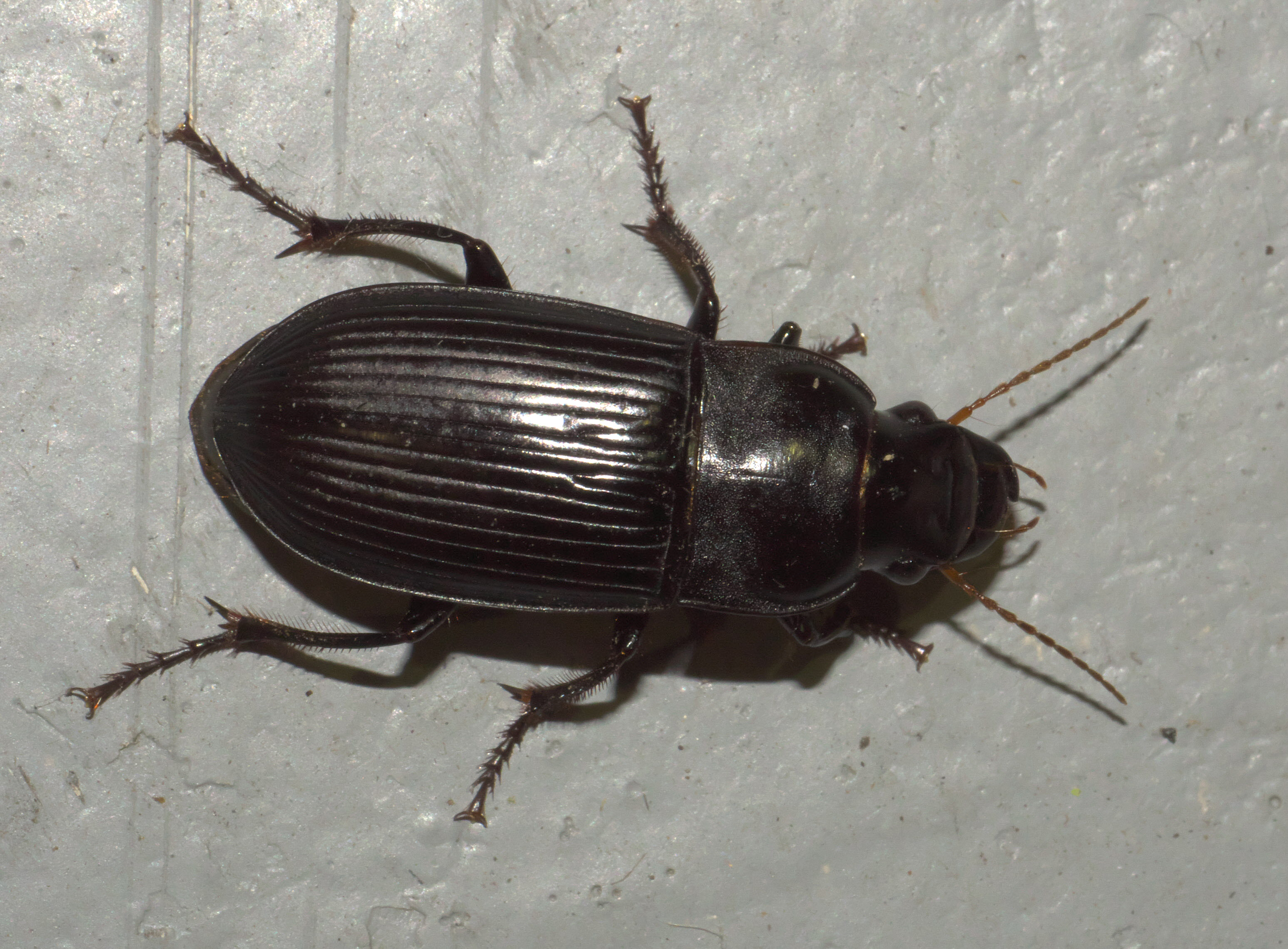

Harpalus is a genus of ground beetle first described by Pierre André Latreille in 1802.

== Species ==
Harpalus contains the following 430 species:

Subgenus Cephalophonus Ganglbauer, 1891
Harpalus cephalotes Fairmaire & Laboulbène, 1854
Subgenus Cryptophonus Brandmayr & Zetto Brandmayr, 1982

Harpalus agnatus Reiche, 1850
Harpalus cyrenaicus Koch, 1939
Harpalus fulvus Dejean, 1829
Harpalus grilli Kataev, 2002
Harpalus idiotus Bates, 1889
Harpalus janinae Jeanne, 1984
Harpalus litigiosus Dejean, 1829
Harpalus melancholicus Dejean, 1829
Harpalus schaumii Wollaston, 1864
Harpalus tenebrosus Dejean, 1829

Subgenus Glanodes Casey, 1914
Harpalus cohni Ball, 1972
Harpalus corpulentus (Casey, 1914)
Harpalus huachuca Ball, 1972
Harpalus obliquus G.Horn, 1880
Harpalus puncticeps (Casey, 1914)
Harpalus stephani Ball, 1972
Subgenus Harpalus Latreille, 1802

Harpalus acupalpoides Reitter, 1900
Harpalus aeneipennis (Faldermann, 1836)
Harpalus aequicollis Motschulsky, 1844
Harpalus affinis (Schrank, 1781)
Harpalus agakhaniantzi (Mikhailov, 1972)
Harpalus akbensis Jedlicka, 1958
Harpalus akinini Tschitscherine, 1895
Harpalus alajensis Tschitscherine, 1898
Harpalus albanicus Reitter, 1900
Harpalus alexandrae Kataev, 1990
Harpalus alexeevi Kataev, 1990
Harpalus alpivagus Tschitscherine, 1899
Harpalus amarellus Bates, 1891
Harpalus amariformis Motschulsky, 1844
Harpalus amplicollis Ménétriés, 1848
Harpalus amputatus Say, 1830
Harpalus anatolicus Tschitscherine, 1898
Harpalus angulatus Putzeys, 1878
Harpalus angustipennis Boheman, 1848
Harpalus angustitarsis Reitter, 1887
Harpalus animosus Casey, 1924
Harpalus anisodactyliformis Solsky, 1874
Harpalus antonowi (Tschitscherine, 1898)
Harpalus anxioides Kataev, 1991
Harpalus anxius (Duftschmid, 1812)
Harpalus araraticus Mlynar, 1979
Harpalus arcuatus Tschitscherine, 1898
Harpalus arnoldii Kataev, 1988
Harpalus ascetes Kataev & Wrase, 1997
Harpalus asemus Basilewsky, 1946
Harpalus aterrimus Casey, 1914
Harpalus atratus Latreille, 1804
Harpalus atrichatus Hatch, 1949
Harpalus atripes Casey, 1914
Harpalus attenuatus Stephens, 1828
Harpalus australasiae Dejean, 1829
Harpalus autumnalis (Duftschmid, 1812)
Harpalus badakschanus Jedlicka, 1956
Harpalus baleensis Clarke, 1973
Harpalus balli Noonan, 1991
Harpalus basanicus J.Sahlberg, 1913
Harpalus basilewskyi Facchini, 2003
Harpalus basuto Basilewsky, 1958
Harpalus bellieri Reiche, 1861
Harpalus beneshi Kataev & Wrase, 1997
Harpalus brachypterus Tschitscherine, 1898
Harpalus brevicornis Germar, 1823
Harpalus brevis Motschulsky, 1844
Harpalus breviusculus Chaudoir, 1846
Harpalus bucharicus Tschitscherine, 1898
Harpalus bulirschi (Facchini, 2012)
Harpalus bungii Chaudoir, 1844
Harpalus caeruleatus Bates, 1878
Harpalus caiphus Reiche & Saulcy, 1855
Harpalus calathoides Motschulsky, 1844
Harpalus capicola Dejean, 1829
Harpalus cardoni Antoine, 1922
Harpalus caspius (Steven, 1806)
Harpalus cautus Dejean, 1829
Harpalus chalcentus Bates, 1873
Harpalus chasanensis Lafer, 1989
Harpalus chobautianus Lutshnik, 1922
Harpalus chrysopus Reitter, 1887
Harpalus circumpunctatus Chaudoir, 1846
Harpalus cisteloides Motschulsky, 1844
Harpalus clarkei Kataev & J.Schmidt, 2020
Harpalus compressus Motschulsky, 1844
Harpalus contemptus Dejean, 1829
Harpalus convexus Faldermann, 1836
Harpalus corporosus (Motschulsky, 1862)
Harpalus corrugatus Basilewsky, 1958
Harpalus crates Bates, 1883
Harpalus cupreus Dejean, 1829
Harpalus cursorius Péringuey, 1896
Harpalus cyanopterus (Tschitscherine, 1897)
Harpalus cyclogonus Chaudoir, 1844
Harpalus danieli Reitter, 1900
Harpalus davidianus Tschitscherine in Jakobson, 1903
Harpalus decipiens Dejean, 1829
Harpalus defector Péringuey, 1896
Harpalus desertus LeConte, 1859
Harpalus diligens Tschitscherine, 1898
Harpalus dimidiatus (P.Rossi, 1790)
Harpalus dispar Dejean, 1829
Harpalus dissitus Antoine, 1931
Harpalus distinguendus (Duftschmid, 1812)
Harpalus diversicollis Basilewsky, 1958
Harpalus dubius Boheman, 1848
Harpalus dudkoi Kataev, 2011
Harpalus durangoensis Bates, 1891
Harpalus ebeninus Heyden, 1870
Harpalus egenus Dejean, 1829
Harpalus egorovi Lafer, 1989
Harpalus ellipsis LeConte, 1847
Harpalus elliptipennis Facchini, 2003
Harpalus erosus Mannerheim, 1825
Harpalus exiguus Boheman, 1848
Harpalus famelicus Tschitscherine, 1898
Harpalus farkaci Kataev & Wrase, 1995
Harpalus fimetarius Dejean, 1829
Harpalus flavescens (Piller & Mitterpacher, 1783)
Harpalus flavicornis Dejean, 1829
Harpalus foveiger Tschitscherine, 1895
Harpalus franzi Mateu, 1954
Harpalus frater Chaudoir, 1876
Harpalus fraternus LeConte, 1852
Harpalus froelichii Sturm, 1818
Harpalus fulvicornis Thunberg, 1806
Harpalus fulvilabris Mannerheim, 1853
Harpalus fulvipennis Chaudoir, 1843
Harpalus fuscicornis Ménétriés, 1832
Harpalus fuscipalpis Sturm, 1818
Harpalus fuscipennis Wiedemann, 1825
Harpalus fuscoaeneus Dejean, 1829
Harpalus ganssuensis Semenov, 1889
Harpalus giacomazzoi Kataev & Wrase, 1996
Harpalus gilgil Basilewsky, 1946
Harpalus gisellae Csiki, 1932
Harpalus glasunovi Kataev, 1987
Harpalus gravis LeConte, 1858
Harpalus gregoryi Alluaud, 1917
Harpalus hartmanni Kataev, 2002
Harpalus herbivagus Say, 1823
Harpalus heyrovskyi Jedlicka, 1928
Harpalus hiekei Kataev & Wrase, 2010
Harpalus hirtipes (Panzer, 1796)
Harpalus honestus (Duftschmid, 1812)
Harpalus hospes Sturm, 1818
Harpalus hybridus Boheman, 1848
Harpalus impressus Roth, 1851
Harpalus inconcinnus Chaudoir, 1876
Harpalus indianus Csiki, 1932
Harpalus indicola Bates, 1878
Harpalus indigens Casey, 1924
Harpalus inexspectatus Kataev, 1989
Harpalus ingenuus Tschitscherine, 1898
Harpalus innocuus LeConte, 1863
Harpalus italus Schaum, 1860
Harpalus jeanneli Basilewsky, 1946
Harpalus jordanus Jedlicka, 1964
Harpalus kabakianus Kataev, 1988
Harpalus kabakovi Kataev, 1987
Harpalus kadleci Kataev & Wrase, 1995
Harpalus kadyrbekovi Kataev, 1988
Harpalus kagyzmanicus Kataev, 1984
Harpalus kandaharensis Jedlicka, 1956
Harpalus karakorum Jedlicka, 1958
Harpalus karamani Apfelbeck, 1902
Harpalus kazanensis Jedlicka, 1958
Harpalus kaznakovi Kataev & Wrase, 1997
Harpalus kibonoti Alluaud, 1927
Harpalus kirgisicus (Motschulsky, 1844)
Harpalus kiritshenkoi Kataev, 1990
Harpalus klapperichi Jedlicka, 1956
Harpalus kmecoi Facchini, 2003
Harpalus kozlovi Kataev, 1993
Harpalus kryzhanovskii Kataev, 1988
Harpalus kunarensis Kataev, 1993
Harpalus laetus Reiche, 1843
Harpalus laevipes Zetterstedt, 1828
Harpalus lama Kataev & Wrase, 1997
Harpalus lateralis Dejean, 1829
Harpalus laticeps LeConte, 1850
Harpalus latus (Linnaeus, 1758)
Harpalus lederi Tschitscherine, 1899
Harpalus lethierryi Reiche, 1860
Harpalus lewisii LeConte, 1865
Harpalus longipalmatus Mordkovitsh, 1969
Harpalus lopezi J.Serrano & Lencina, 2009
Harpalus lugubris Boheman, 1848
Harpalus lumbaris Mannerheim, 1825
Harpalus luteicornis (Duftschmid, 1812)
Harpalus lutshniki Schauberger, 1932
Harpalus macronotus Tschitscherine, 1893
Harpalus mairei Peyerimhoff, 1928
Harpalus major (Motschulsky, 1850)
Harpalus makhekensis Basilewsky, 1958
Harpalus manas Kataev, 1990
Harpalus marginellus Gyllenhal, 1827
Harpalus martini Van Dyke, 1926
Harpalus masoreoides Bates, 1878
Harpalus massarti Burgeon, 1936
Harpalus mauritanicus Gaubil, 1844
Harpalus medvedevi Kataev, 2006
Harpalus megacephalus LeConte, 1847
Harpalus melaneus Bates, 1878
Harpalus metallinus Ménétriés, 1836
Harpalus metarsius Andrewes, 1930
Harpalus meteorus Basilewsky, 1946
Harpalus michaili Kataev, 1990
Harpalus michailovi Kataev, 1987
Harpalus microthorax (Motschulsky, 1849)
Harpalus miles Péringuey, 1896
Harpalus minutissimus Facchini, 2015
Harpalus minutulus Kataev & Liang, 2004
Harpalus mitridati Pliginskiy, 1915
Harpalus mlynari Kataev, 1990
Harpalus modestus Dejean, 1829
Harpalus morvani Kataev, 2002
Harpalus murzini Kataev, 2008
Harpalus nanniscus Péringuey, 1896
Harpalus natalensis Boheman, 1848
Harpalus natalicus Péringuey, 1896
Harpalus neglectus Audinet-Serville, 1821
Harpalus nevadensis K. & J.Daniel, 1898
Harpalus nigrans A.Morawitz, 1862
Harpalus nigritarsis C.R.Sahlberg, 1827
Harpalus numidicus Bedel, 1893
Harpalus nyassicus Basilewsky, 1946
Harpalus oblitus Dejean, 1829
Harpalus obnixus Casey, 1924
Harpalus ochropus Kirby, 1837
Harpalus oodioides Dejean, 1829
Harpalus opacipennis (Haldeman, 1843)
Harpalus optabilis Dejean, 1829
Harpalus ovtshinnikovi Kataev, 1990
Harpalus pallidipennis A.Morawitz, 1862
Harpalus pallipes Chaudoir, 1837
Harpalus parallelocollis Facchini, 2003
Harpalus parasinuatus Kataev & Liang, 2007
Harpalus parvulus Dejean, 1829
Harpalus petri Tschitscherine, 1902
Harpalus picipennis (Duftschmid, 1812)
Harpalus plancyi Tschitscherine, 1897
Harpalus plenalis Casey, 1914
Harpalus politus Dejean, 1829
Harpalus polyglyptus Schaum, 1862
Harpalus potanini Tschitscherine, 1906
Harpalus praecurrens Schauberger, 1934
Harpalus procognatus Lorenz, 1998
Harpalus progrediens Schauberger, 1922
Harpalus prosperus Basilewsky, 1972
Harpalus providens Casey, 1914
Harpalus pseudoserripes Reitter, 1900
Harpalus pterostichus (Reitter, 1900)
Harpalus puetzi Kataev & Wrase, 1997
Harpalus pulchrinulus Reitter, 1900
Harpalus pulvinatus Ménétriés, 1848
Harpalus pumilus Sturm, 1818
Harpalus punctatostriatus Dejean, 1829
Harpalus punctipennis Mulsant, 1852
Harpalus pusillus (Motschulsky, 1850)
Harpalus pygmaeus Dejean, 1829
Harpalus quadratus Chaudoir, 1846
Harpalus raphaili Kataev, 1997
Harpalus reflexus Putzeys in Schneider & Leder, 1878
Harpalus reitteri Wrase & Kataev, 2011
Harpalus remboides Solsky, 1874
Harpalus reversus Casey, 1924
Harpalus rhemboides Solsky, 1874
Harpalus rivalsi Jeannel, 1948
Harpalus rotundus Facchini, 2003
Harpalus rougemonti Clarke, 1973
Harpalus rubripes (Duftschmid, 1812)
Harpalus rufipalpis Sturm, 1818
Harpalus rufiscapus Gebler, 1833
Harpalus rufitarsoides Schauberger, 1934
Harpalus rufomarginatus (Boheman, 1848)
Harpalus rumelicus Apfelbeck, 1904
Harpalus salinulus Reitter, 1900
Harpalus salinus Dejean, 1829
Harpalus sanctaehelenae Basilewsky, 1972
Harpalus saxicola Dejean, 1829
Harpalus semenowi Tschitscherine, 1901
Harpalus semipunctatus Dejean, 1829
Harpalus serripes (Quensel, 1806)
Harpalus servus (Duftschmid, 1812)
Harpalus setiporus (Reitter, 1894)
Harpalus siculus Dejean, 1829
Harpalus silipes Dejean, 1831
Harpalus sinuaticollis Facchini, 2015
Harpalus sinuatus Tschitscherine, 1893
Harpalus smaragdinus (Duftschmid, 1812)
Harpalus smyrnensis Heyden, 1888
Harpalus solitaris Dejean, 1829
Harpalus somereni Basilewsky, 1946
Harpalus somnulentus Dejean, 1829
Harpalus spadiceus Dejean, 1829
Harpalus spretus Péringuey, 1896
Harpalus spurius Péringuey, 1896
Harpalus stevenii Dejean, 1829
Harpalus stevensi Kataev, 2011
Harpalus stoetznerianus Schauberger, 1932
Harpalus strenuus Tschitscherine, 1898
Harpalus subaeneus Boheman, 1848
Harpalus subcylindricus Dejean, 1829
Harpalus subtruncatus Chaudoir, 1846
Harpalus sulphuripes Germar, 1823
Harpalus sundaicus Schauberger, 1933
Harpalus sushenicus Kataev, 1990
Harpalus suturangulus Reitter, 1887
Harpalus szalliesi Kataev & Wrase, 1995
Harpalus taciturnus Dejean, 1829
Harpalus tangutorum Kataev, 1993
Harpalus tardus (Panzer, 1796)
Harpalus tarsalis Mannerheim, 1825
Harpalus terrestris (Motschulsky, 1844)
Harpalus tibeticus Andrewes, 1930
Harpalus tichonis Jakobson, 1907
Harpalus tiridates Reitter, 1900
Harpalus tithonus Reitter, 1900
Harpalus tjanschanicus Semenov, 1889
Harpalus torosensis Jedlicka, 1961
Harpalus torridoides Reitter, 1900
Harpalus trichophorus Tschitscherine, 1897
Harpalus triseriatus A.Fleischer, 1897
Harpalus turcicus Jedlicka, 1958
Harpalus turmalinus Erichson, 1847
Harpalus udege Lafer, 1989
Harpalus uniformis (Motschulsky, 1844)
Harpalus ussuricus Mlynar, 1979
Harpalus vanemdeni Schauberger, 1932
Harpalus venator Boheman, 1848
Harpalus ventralis LeConte, 1847
Harpalus vereschaginae Kataev, 1988
Harpalus vernicosus Kataev & Liang, 2007
Harpalus viridanus (Motschulsky, 1844)
Harpalus viridicupreus Reiche, 1843
Harpalus vittatus Gebler, 1833
Harpalus wadiensis Jedlicka, 1964
Harpalus wohlberedti Emden, 1932
Harpalus xanthopus Gemminger & Harold, 1868
Harpalus zabroides Dejean, 1829
Harpalus zhdankoi Kataev, 1990

Subgenus Loboharpalus Schauberger, 1932
Harpalus platynotus Bates, 1873
Harpalus rubefactus Bates, 1873
Subgenus Opadius Casey, 1914
Harpalus apache Kataev, 2010
Harpalus cordatus (LeConte, 1853)
Harpalus cordifer Notman, 1919
Subgenus Plectralidus Casey, 1914
Harpalus erraticus Say, 1823
Harpalus retractus LeConte, 1863
Subgenus Pseudoophonus Motschulsky, 1844

Harpalus actiosus Casey, 1914
Harpalus aenigma (Tschitscherine, 1897)
Harpalus alienus Bates, 1878
Harpalus aogashimensis (Habu, 1957)
Harpalus azumai Habu, 1968
Harpalus babai Habu, 1973
Harpalus calceatus (Duftschmid, 1812)
Harpalus caliginosus (Fabricius, 1775)
Harpalus capito A.Morawitz, 1862
Harpalus compar LeConte, 1847
Harpalus coreanus (Tschitscherine, 1895)
Harpalus davidi (Tschitscherine, 1897)
Harpalus disimuciulus Huang; Lei; Yan & Hu, 1996
Harpalus eous Tschitscherine, 1901
Harpalus erythropus Dejean, 1829
Harpalus faunus Say, 1823
Harpalus fokienensis Schauberger, 1930
Harpalus griseus (Panzer, 1796)
Harpalus hatchi Ball & Anderson, 1962
Harpalus hauserianus Schauberger, 1929
Harpalus indicus Bates, 1891
Harpalus jureceki (Jedlicka, 1928)
Harpalus katiae F.Battoni, 1985
Harpalus liobasis Chaudoir, 1868
Harpalus meghalayensis Kataev, 2001
Harpalus meridianus Andrewes, 1923
Harpalus paratus Casey, 1924
Harpalus pastor Motschulsky, 1844
Harpalus pensylvanicus (DeGeer, 1774)
Harpalus poncei Will, 2002
Harpalus protractus Casey, 1914
Harpalus pseudohauserianus Kataev, 2001
Harpalus pseudophonoides Schauberger, 1930
Harpalus roninus Bates, 1873
Harpalus rufipes (DeGeer, 1774)
Harpalus sericatus Tschitscherine, 1906
Harpalus simplicidens Schauberger, 1929
Harpalus singularis Tschitscherine, 1906
Harpalus sinicus Hope, 1845
Harpalus suensoni Kataev, 1997
Harpalus texanus Casey, 1914
Harpalus tridens A.Morawitz, 1862
Harpalus ussuriensis Chaudoir, 1863
Harpalus vagans LeConte, 1865
Harpalus yinchuanensis Huang, 1993

Subgenus Semiophonus Schauberger, 1933
Harpalus signaticornis (Duftschmid, 1812)
Subgenus Zangoharpalus Huang, 1998
Harpalus mariae Kataev, 1997
Harpalus microdemas Schauberger, 1932
Harpalus praticola Bates, 1891
Harpalus pseudotinctulus Schauberger, 1932
Harpalus tinctulus Bates, 1873
Extinct, not assigned to subgenus

†Harpalus abolitus C. & L.Heyden, 1866
†Harpalus anactus Giebel, 1856
†Harpalus bruckmanni Heer, 1862
†Harpalus burmeisteri Giebel, 1856
†Harpalus conditus Scudder, 1900
†Harpalus constrictus Heer, 1862
†Harpalus deletus Oustalet, 1864
†Harpalus dilatatus Theobald, 1937
†Harpalus ewaldi Giebel, 1856
†Harpalus excavatus Forster, 1891
†Harpalus heeri Giebel, 1856
†Harpalus knorri Giebel, 1856
†Harpalus lheritieri Piton, 1940
†Harpalus liasinus Giebel, 1856
†Harpalus maceratus Wickham, 1911
†Harpalus nero Oustalet, 1864
†Harpalus nitens Birket-Smith, 1977
†Harpalus nuperus Scudder, 1900
†Harpalus obtusus Forster, 1891
†Harpalus oustaleti Meunier, 1915
†Harpalus pleistocenicus Lomnicki, 1894
†Harpalus redivivus Wickham, 1917
†Harpalus schlotheimi Giebel, 1856
†Harpalus sinis Heer, 1847
†Harpalus stierlini Heer, 1862
†Harpalus stygius Heer, 1862
†Harpalus tabidus Heer, 1847
†Harpalus tardigradus Heer, 1862
†Harpalus ulomaeformis Wickham, 1917
†Harpalus veterum Cockerell, 1920
†Harpalus whitfieldi Scudder, 1900
