= Harpalus vernicosus =

Scientific classification
- Kingdom: Animalia
- Phylum: Arthropoda
- Class: Insecta
- Order: Coleoptera
- Suborder: Adephaga
- Family: Carabidae
- Genus: Harpalus
- Species: H. vernicosus

Binomial name
- Harpalus vernicosus Kataev & Liang, 2007

Species of beetle

Harpalus vernicosus is a species of ground beetle in the subfamily Harpalinae. It was described by Kataev & Liang in 2007.
