= Harpalus fuscipennis =

Scientific classification
- Kingdom: Animalia
- Phylum: Arthropoda
- Class: Insecta
- Order: Coleoptera
- Suborder: Adephaga
- Family: Carabidae
- Genus: Harpalus
- Species: H. fuscipennis

Binomial name
- Harpalus fuscipennis Wiedemann, 1825

Species of beetle

Harpalus fuscipennis is a species of ground beetle in the subfamily Harpalinae. It was described by Wiedemann in 1825.
