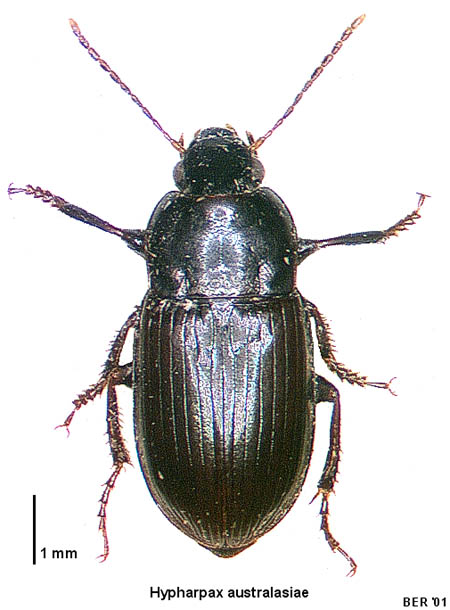

Scientific classification
- Kingdom: Animalia
- Phylum: Arthropoda
- Class: Insecta
- Order: Coleoptera
- Suborder: Adephaga
- Family: Carabidae
- Genus: Harpalus
- Species: H. australasiae

Binomial name
- Harpalus australasiae Dejean, 1829

Synonyms
- Hypharpax australasiae (Dejean, 1829)

= Harpalus australasiae =

Species of beetle

Harpalus australasiae is a species of ground beetle in the subfamily Harpalinae. It was described by Dejean in 1829.
