= Harpalus meghalayensis =

Scientific classification
- Kingdom: Animalia
- Phylum: Arthropoda
- Class: Insecta
- Order: Coleoptera
- Suborder: Adephaga
- Family: Carabidae
- Genus: Harpalus
- Species: H. meghalayensis

Binomial name
- Harpalus meghalayensis Kataev, 2001

Species of beetle

Harpalus meghalayensis is a species of ground beetle in the subfamily Harpalinae. It was described by Kataev in 2001.
