= Harpalus basilewskyi =

Scientific classification
- Kingdom: Animalia
- Phylum: Arthropoda
- Class: Insecta
- Order: Coleoptera
- Suborder: Adephaga
- Family: Carabidae
- Genus: Harpalus
- Species: H. basilewskyi

Binomial name
- Harpalus basilewskyi Facchini, 2003

Species of beetle

Harpalus basilewskyi is a species of ground beetle in the subfamily Harpalinae. It was described by Facchini in 2003.
