= Harpalus roninus =

Scientific classification
- Kingdom: Animalia
- Phylum: Arthropoda
- Class: Insecta
- Order: Coleoptera
- Suborder: Adephaga
- Family: Carabidae
- Genus: Harpalus
- Species: H. roninus

Binomial name
- Harpalus roninus Bates, 1873

Species of beetle

Harpalus roninus is a species of ground beetle in the subfamily Harpalinae. It was described by Henry Walter Bates in 1873.
