= Harpalus anxioides =

Scientific classification
- Kingdom: Animalia
- Phylum: Arthropoda
- Class: Insecta
- Order: Coleoptera
- Suborder: Adephaga
- Family: Carabidae
- Genus: Harpalus
- Species: H. anxioides

Binomial name
- Harpalus anxioides Kataev, 1991

Species of beetle

Harpalus anxioides is a species of ground beetle in the subfamily Harpalinae. It was described by Kataev in 1991.
