= Harpalus atrichatus =

Scientific classification
- Kingdom: Animalia
- Phylum: Arthropoda
- Class: Insecta
- Order: Coleoptera
- Suborder: Adephaga
- Family: Carabidae
- Genus: Harpalus
- Species: H. atrichatus

Binomial name
- Harpalus atrichatus Hatch, 1949

Species of beetle

Harpalus atrichatus is a species of ground beetle in the subfamily Harpalinae. It was described by Hatch in 1949.
