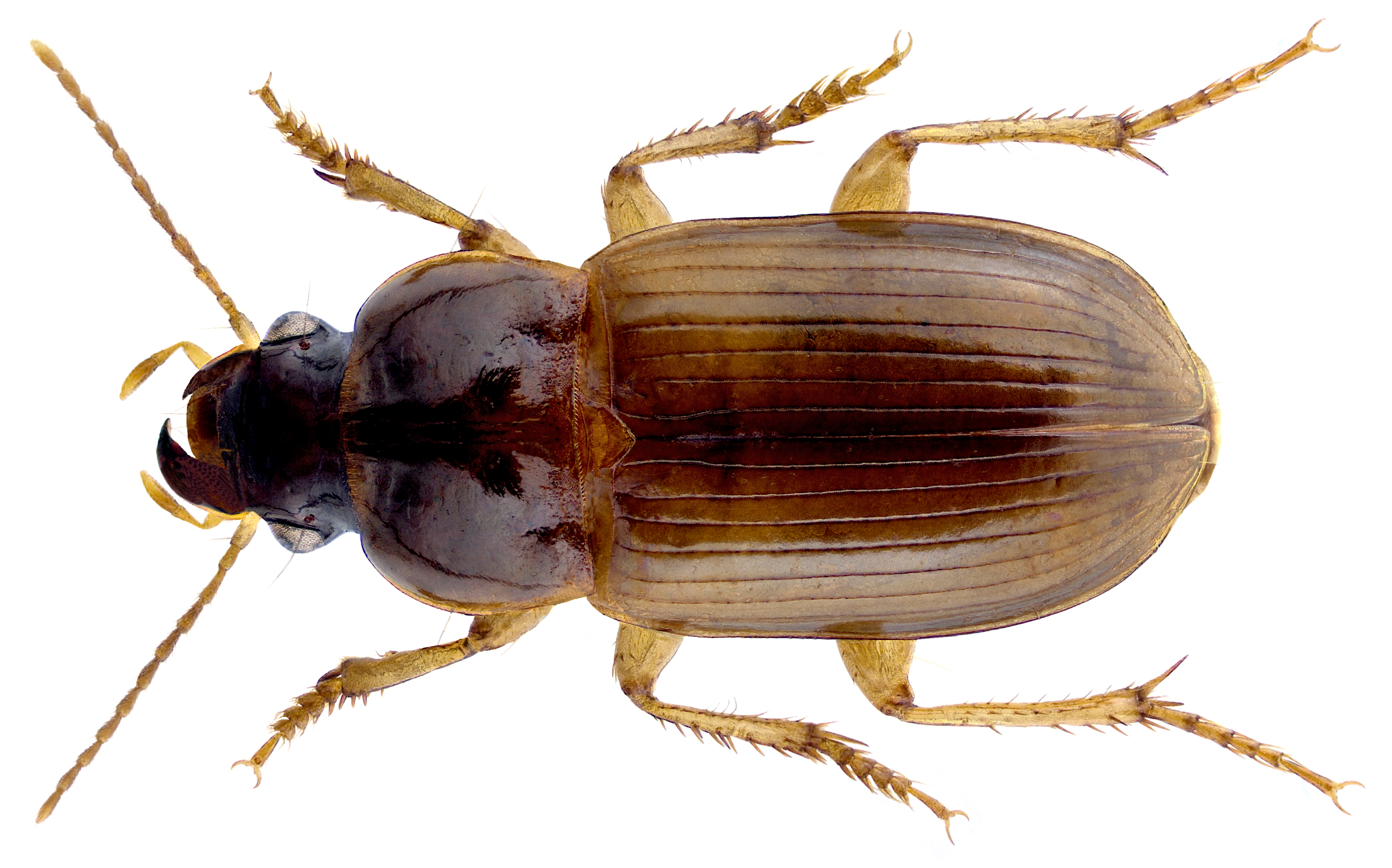

Scientific classification
- Kingdom: Animalia
- Phylum: Arthropoda
- Class: Insecta
- Order: Coleoptera
- Suborder: Adephaga
- Family: Carabidae
- Genus: Harpalus
- Species: H. parvulus

Binomial name
- Harpalus parvulus Dejean, 1829

= Harpalus parvulus =

Species of beetle

Harpalus parvulus is a species of ground beetle in the subfamily Harpalinae. It was described by Pierre François Marie Auguste Dejean in 1829. The type specimen was said to have come from the Cape of Good Hope.
