= Harpalus pallipes =

Scientific classification
- Kingdom: Animalia
- Phylum: Arthropoda
- Class: Insecta
- Order: Coleoptera
- Suborder: Adephaga
- Family: Carabidae
- Genus: Harpalus
- Species: H. pallipes

Binomial name
- Harpalus pallipes Chaudoir, 1837

Species of beetle

Harpalus pallipes is a species of ground beetle in the subfamily Harpalinae. It was described by Chaudoir in 1837.
