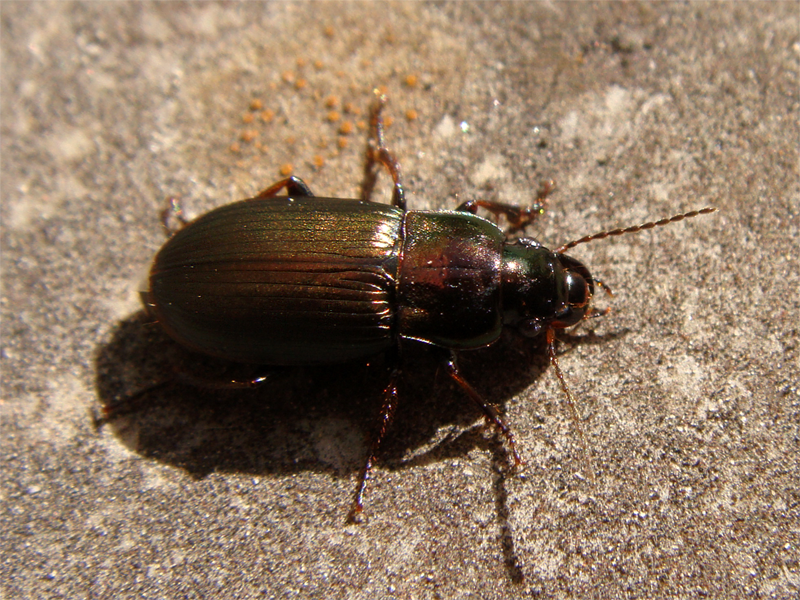

Scientific classification
- Kingdom: Animalia
- Phylum: Arthropoda
- Class: Insecta
- Order: Coleoptera
- Suborder: Adephaga
- Family: Carabidae
- Genus: Harpalus
- Species: H. distinguendus

Binomial name
- Harpalus distinguendus (Duftschmid, 1812)

= Harpalus distinguendus =

Species of beetle

Harpalus distinguendus is a species of ground beetle in the subfamily Harpalinae. It was described by Duftschmid in 1812.
