= Harpalus inexspectatus =

Scientific classification
- Kingdom: Animalia
- Phylum: Arthropoda
- Class: Insecta
- Order: Coleoptera
- Suborder: Adephaga
- Family: Carabidae
- Genus: Harpalus
- Species: H. inexspectatus

Binomial name
- Harpalus inexspectatus Kataev, 1989

Species of beetle

Harpalus inexspectatus is a species of ground beetle in the subfamily Harpalinae. It was described by Kataev in 1989.
