= Harpalus tangutorum =

Scientific classification
- Kingdom: Animalia
- Phylum: Arthropoda
- Class: Insecta
- Order: Coleoptera
- Suborder: Adephaga
- Family: Carabidae
- Genus: Harpalus
- Species: H. tangutorum

Binomial name
- Harpalus tangutorum Kataev, 1993

Species of beetle

Harpalus tangutorum is a species of ground beetle in the subfamily Harpalinae. It was described by Boris Mikhailovich Kataev in 1993.
