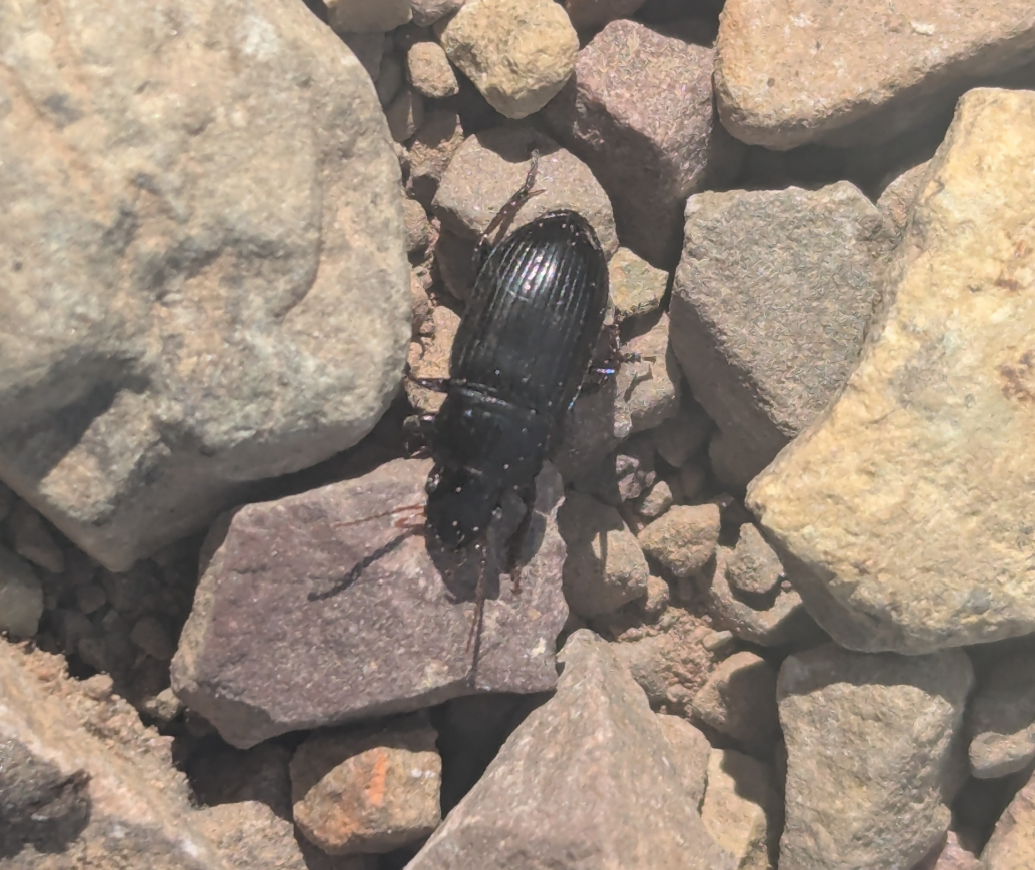

Scientific classification
- Kingdom: Animalia
- Phylum: Arthropoda
- Class: Insecta
- Order: Coleoptera
- Suborder: Adephaga
- Family: Carabidae
- Genus: Harpalus
- Species: H. fraternus

Binomial name
- Harpalus fraternus LeConte, 1852

Synonyms
- Euharpalops wadei Casey, 1924

= Harpalus fraternus =

Species of beetle

Harpalus fraternus is a species of ground beetle in the subfamily Harpalinae. It is native to the western Canada and United States. It was described by John Lawrence LeConte in 1852.

== Description ==
Protibia with one to three ventroapical spines (occasionally four; if protibia with three or four ventroapical spines, then preapical spines on outer margin of protibia isolated from spines on ventral side of tibia and not arranged with them in a single row.
