= Harpalus xanthopus =

Scientific classification
- Kingdom: Animalia
- Phylum: Arthropoda
- Class: Insecta
- Order: Coleoptera
- Suborder: Adephaga
- Family: Carabidae
- Genus: Harpalus
- Species: H. xanthopus

Binomial name
- Harpalus xanthopus Gemminger & Harold, 1868

Species of beetle

Harpalus xanthopus is a species of ground beetle in the subfamily Harpalinae. It was described by Gemminger & Harold in 1868.
