= Harpalus zabroides =

Scientific classification
- Kingdom: Animalia
- Phylum: Arthropoda
- Class: Insecta
- Order: Coleoptera
- Suborder: Adephaga
- Family: Carabidae
- Genus: Harpalus
- Species: H. zabroides

Binomial name
- Harpalus zabroides (Dejean, 1829)

Synonyms
- Harpalus lycaon Lindar, 1860

Species of beetle

Harpalus zabroides is a species of ground beetle native to Europe, where it can be found throughout Central Europe and in such countries as Baltic states (except for Estonia), Benelux, Belarus, Italy, Spain, Ukraine, in all states of former Yugoslavia (except for Croatia and North Macedonia), and all parts of Russia (except north and northwest). It is also found in such Asian countries as Armenia, Georgia, Iran, Kazakhstan, Kyrgyzstan, Tajikistan, and Turkey.
