= Harpalus heyrovskyi =

Scientific classification
- Kingdom: Animalia
- Phylum: Arthropoda
- Class: Insecta
- Order: Coleoptera
- Suborder: Adephaga
- Family: Carabidae
- Genus: Harpalus
- Species: H. heyrovskyi

Binomial name
- Harpalus heyrovskyi Jedlicka, 1928

Species of beetle

Harpalus heyrovskyi is a species of ground beetle in the subfamily Harpalinae. It was described by Jedlicka in 1928.
