= Harpalus basanicus =

Scientific classification
- Kingdom: Animalia
- Phylum: Arthropoda
- Class: Insecta
- Order: Coleoptera
- Suborder: Adephaga
- Family: Carabidae
- Genus: Harpalus
- Species: H. basanicus

Binomial name
- Harpalus basanicus J.R. Sahlberg, 1911

Species of beetle

Harpalus basanicus is a species of ground beetle in the subfamily Harpalinae. It was described by J.R. Sahlberg in 1911.
