= Harpalus aogashimensis =

Scientific classification
- Kingdom: Animalia
- Phylum: Arthropoda
- Class: Insecta
- Order: Coleoptera
- Suborder: Adephaga
- Family: Carabidae
- Genus: Harpalus
- Species: H. aogashimensis

Binomial name
- Harpalus aogashimensis (Habu, 1957)

Species of beetle

Harpalus aogashimensis is a species of ground beetle in the subfamily Harpalinae. It was described by Habu in 1957.
