= Harpalus vittatus =

Scientific classification
- Kingdom: Animalia
- Phylum: Arthropoda
- Class: Insecta
- Order: Coleoptera
- Suborder: Adephaga
- Family: Carabidae
- Genus: Harpalus
- Species: H. vittatus

Binomial name
- Harpalus vittatus Gelber, 1833

Species of beetle

Harpalus vittatus is a species of ground beetle in the subfamily Harpalinae. It was described by Gelber in 1833.
