= Harpalus nigrans =

Scientific classification
- Kingdom: Animalia
- Phylum: Arthropoda
- Class: Insecta
- Order: Coleoptera
- Suborder: Adephaga
- Family: Carabidae
- Genus: Harpalus
- Species: H. nigrans

Binomial name
- Harpalus nigrans A. Morawitz, 1862

Species of beetle

Harpalus nigrans is a species of ground beetle in the subfamily Harpalinae. It was described by A. Morawitz in 1862.
