= Harpalus indianus =

Scientific classification
- Kingdom: Animalia
- Phylum: Arthropoda
- Class: Insecta
- Order: Coleoptera
- Suborder: Adephaga
- Family: Carabidae
- Genus: Harpalus
- Species: H. indianus

Binomial name
- Harpalus indianus Csiki, 1932

Species of beetle

Harpalus indianus is a species of ground beetle in the subfamily Harpalinae. It was described by Csiki in 1932.
