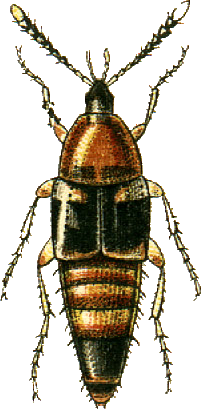
- Bolitobius

Scientific classification
- Kingdom: Animalia
- Phylum: Arthropoda
- Class: Insecta
- Order: Coleoptera
- Suborder: Polyphaga
- Infraorder: Staphyliniformia
- Family: Staphylinidae
- Subfamily: Tachyporinae
- Tribe: Mycetoporini; Thomson, 1859

= Mycetoporini =

Tribe of beetles

Mycetoporini is a tribe of crab-like rove beetles in the family Staphylinidae. There are about 8 genera and at least 20 described species in Mycetoporini.

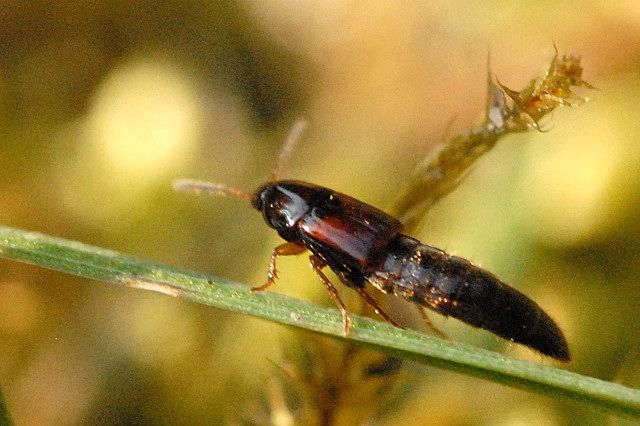
Mycetoporus

== Genera ==
These eight genera belong to the tribe Mycetoporini:

- Bolitobius Leach, 1819^{c g b}
- Bolitopunctus Campbell, 1993^{g b}
- Bryoporus Kraatz, 1857^{c g b}
- Carphacis Gozis, 1886^{c g b}
- Ischnosoma Stephens, 1829^{g b}
- Lordithon Thomson, 1859^{c g b}
- Mycetoporus Mannerheim, 1830^{c g b}
- Neobolitobius Campbell, 1993^{g b}

Data sources: i = ITIS, c = Catalogue of Life, g = GBIF, b = Bugguide.net
