= List of Tachinus species =

This is a list of 124 species in Tachinus, a genus of crab-like rove beetles in the family Staphylinidae.

== Tachinus species ==
- Tachinus addendus Horn, 1877^{g b}
- Tachinus alishanensis Hayashi, 1990^{c g}
- Tachinus andoi Tang et al., 2003^{c g}
- Tachinus angustatus Horn, 1877^{g}
- Tachinus apicalis Erichson, 1839^{g}
- Tachinus apterus Méklin, 1853^{g}
- Tachinus atripes J.Sahlberg, 1876^{g}
- Tachinus axillaris Erichson, 1839^{g b}
- Tachinus basalis Erichson, 1839^{c g b}
- Tachinus beckeri Ullrich, 1975^{c g}
- Tachinus becquarti Bernhauer, 1938^{c g}
- Tachinus bernhaueri Luze, 1901^{c g}
- Tachinus bicuspidatus Sahlberg, J., 1880^{c g}
- Tachinus binotatus Li et al., 2000^{c g}
- Tachinus bipustulatus Fabricius, 1793^{c g}
- Tachinus bonvouloiri Pandellé, 1869^{g}
- Tachinus brevicuspis Schülke, 2003^{c g}
- Tachinus brevipennis J.R.Sahlberg, 1880^{g}
- Tachinus brunneus Ullrich, 1975^{g}
- Tachinus caelatus Ullrich, 1975^{c g}
- Tachinus canadensis Horn, 1877^{g}
- Tachinus chinensis Bernhauer, 1933^{c g}
- Tachinus contortus Hatch, 1957^{g}
- Tachinus corticinus Gravenhorst, 1802^{g b}
- Tachinus crotchi ^{b}
- Tachinus crotchii Horn, 1877^{g}
- Tachinus debilis Horn, 1877^{g}
- Tachinus dilatatus Hatch, 1957^{g}
- Tachinus discoideus Erichson, 1839^{g}
- Tachinus edentulus Ullrich, 1975^{c g}
- Tachinus edwardi Herman, 2001^{g}
- Tachinus elegans Eppelsheim, 1893^{c g}
- Tachinus elongatus Gyllenhal, 1810^{c g}
- Tachinus emeiensis Zhang et al., 2003^{c g}
- Tachinus fanjingensis Li et al., 2004^{c g}
- Tachinus fauveli Pandelle, 1869^{g}
- Tachinus fimbriatus Gravenhorst, 1802^{g b}
- Tachinus fimetarius Gravenhorst, 1802^{g}
- Tachinus flavolimbatus Pandellé, 1869^{g}
- Tachinus fortepunctatus Bernhauer, 1933^{c g}
- Tachinus frigidus Erichson, 1839^{g b}
- Tachinus fulvipes Erichson, 1840^{g}
- Tachinus fumipennis (Say, 1834)^{g b}
- Tachinus gelidus Eppelsheim, 1893^{c g}
- Tachinus gigantulus Bernhauer, 1933^{c g}
- Tachinus grandicollis Bernhauer, 1917^{c g}
- Tachinus hedini Ullrich, 1975^{c g}
- Tachinus humeralis Gravenhorst, 1802^{g}
- Tachinus humeronotatus Zhao & Li, 2002^{c g}
- Tachinus instabilis Mäklin, 1853^{c g}
- Tachinus insularis Hayashi, 1987^{c g}
- Tachinus jacuticus ^{g}
- Tachinus japonicus Sharp, 1888^{c g}
- Tachinus javanus Cameron, 1937^{c g}
- Tachinus kabakovi Veselova, 1993^{c g}
- Tachinus kaiseri Bernhauer, 1934^{c g}
- Tachinus kaszabi Ullrich, 1975^{c g}
- Tachinus laticollis Gravenhorst, 1802^{c g}
- Tachinus latissimus Tikhomirova, 1973^{g}
- Tachinus latiusculus Markel & Kiesenwetter, 1848^{g}
- Tachinus licenti Bernhauer, 1938^{c g}
- Tachinus lignorum (Linnaeus, 1758)^{g}
- Tachinus lii Schülke, 2005^{c g}
- Tachinus limbatus Melsheimer, 1844^{g b}
- Tachinus lohsei Ullrich, 1975^{c g}
- Tachinus longelytratus Ullrich, 1975^{c g}
- Tachinus ludwigbenicki Ullrich, 1975^{c g}
- Tachinus luridus Erichson, 1840^{g b}
- Tachinus maculicollis Mäklin, 1852^{g b}
- Tachinus maculipennis Cameron, 1928^{c g}
- Tachinus maderi Bernhauer, 1939^{c g}
- Tachinus manueli Sharp, 1874^{g}
- Tachinus marginatus Fabricius, 1793^{c g}
- Tachinus marginellus (Fabricius, 1781)^{g}
- Tachinus masahiroi Li & Zhao, 2003^{c g}
- Tachinus masaohayashii Hayashi, 1990^{c g}
- Tachinus memnonius Gravenhorst, 1802^{g b}
- Tachinus mercatii Jarrige, 1966^{g}
- Tachinus miltoni Schülke, 2003^{c g}
- Tachinus minimus Campbell, 1973^{g}
- Tachinus montanellus Bernhauer, 1933^{c g}
- Tachinus nigriceps Sharp, 1888^{c g}
- Tachinus nigricornis Mannerheim, 1843^{g}
- Tachinus nitouensis Ullrich, 1975^{c g}
- Tachinus ohbayashii Li et al., 2001^{c g}
- Tachinus pallipes Gravenhorst, 1806^{c g}
- Tachinus parasibiricus Zhang et al., 2003^{c g}
- Tachinus piceus Cameron, 1932^{g}
- Tachinus picipes Erichson, 1839^{g b}
- Tachinus potanini Veselova, 1981^{c g}
- Tachinus punctipennis Sahlberg, J., 1876^{c g}
- Tachinus punctus Gravenhorst, 1806^{g}
- Tachinus quebecensis Robert, 1946^{g}
- Tachinus rainieri Hatch, 1957^{g}
- Tachinus roborowskyi Reitter, 1887^{c g}
- Tachinus robustus Zhao et al., 2003^{c g}
- Tachinus rufipennis Gyllenhal, 1810^{c g}
- Tachinus rufipes Linnaeus, 1758^{c g}
- Tachinus sahlbergi Fauvel, 1900^{c g}
- Tachinus satoi Li & Zhao, 2003^{c g}
- Tachinus scapularis Stephens, 1832^{g}
- Tachinus schilowi Ullrich, 1975^{c g}
- Tachinus schneideri Luze, 1900^{g}
- Tachinus schwarzi Horn, 1877^{g}
- Tachinus semirufus Horn, 1877^{g b}
- Tachinus sibiricus Sharp, 1888^{c g}
- Tachinus signatus Gravenhorst, 1802^{g}
- Tachinus silphoides Schülke, 2005^{c g}
- Tachinus sinensis Li & Zhao, 2002^{c g}
- Tachinus smetanai Campbell, 1973^{g}
- Tachinus splendidus Gravenhorst, 1806^{g}
- Tachinus stacesmithi Campbell, 1973^{g}
- Tachinus striatipennis Schülke, 2005^{c g}
- Tachinus subterraneus (Linnaeus, 1758)^{g}
- Tachinus sugayai Schülke, 2003^{c g}
- Tachinus taichungensis Campbell, 1993^{c g}
- Tachinus taiwanensis Shibata, 1979^{g}
- Tachinus thruppi Hatch, 1957^{g}
- Tachinus tianmuensis Li et al., 2000^{c g}
- Tachinus vergatus Campbell, 1973^{g}
- Tachinus watanabei Shibata, 1979^{c g}
- Tachinus yasuakii Li et al., 2002^{c g}
- Tachinus yasutoshii Ito, 1993^{c g}
- Tachinus yushanensis Campbell, 1993^{c g}

Data sources: i = ITIS, c = Catalogue of Life, g = GBIF, b = Bugguide.net
