= Phytoecia erivanica =

Scientific classification
- Kingdom: Animalia
- Phylum: Arthropoda
- Class: Insecta
- Order: Coleoptera
- Suborder: Polyphaga
- Infraorder: Cucujiformia
- Family: Cerambycidae
- Genus: Phytoecia
- Species: P. erivanica

Binomial name
- Phytoecia erivanica Reitter, 1899

Synonyms
- Semiangusta erivanica (Reitter, 1899); Phytoecia pici var. erivanica Reitter, 1899

Species of beetle

Phytoecia erivanica is a species of beetle in the family Cerambycidae. It was described by Reitter in 1899, originally as a varietas of Phytoecia pici. It is known from Iran, Armenia, and possibly Turkey.
