= Phytoecia bodemeyeri =

Scientific classification
- Kingdom: Animalia
- Phylum: Arthropoda
- Class: Insecta
- Order: Coleoptera
- Suborder: Polyphaga
- Infraorder: Cucujiformia
- Family: Cerambycidae
- Genus: Phytoecia
- Species: P. bodemeyeri

Binomial name
- Phytoecia bodemeyeri Reitter, 1913

Species of beetle

Phytoecia bodemeyeri is a species of beetle in the family Cerambycidae. It was described by Reitter in 1913. It is known from Iran.
