= Penthophonus =

Scientific classification
- Kingdom: Animalia
- Phylum: Arthropoda
- Class: Insecta
- Order: Coleoptera
- Suborder: Adephaga
- Family: Carabidae
- Subfamily: Harpalinae
- Tribe: Harpalini
- Subtribe: Harpalina
- Genus: Penthophonus; Reitter, 1900

Synonyms
- Pentophonus Csiki, 1932

Genus of beetles

Penthophonus is a genus in the ground beetle family Carabidae. There are at least four described species in Penthophonus.

== Species ==
These four species belong to the genus Penthophonus:

- Penthophonus astutus Tschitscherine, 1903 (Syria)
- Penthophonus glasunovi (Tschitscherine, 1898) (Iran)
- Penthophonus peyroni (Piochard de la Brûlerie, 1873) (Lebanon, Syria, Turkey)
- Penthophonus taygetanus Pic, 1911 (Greece)
