= Eriophonus =

Eriophonus grandiceps

Scientific classification
- Kingdom: Animalia
- Phylum: Arthropoda
- Class: Insecta
- Order: Coleoptera
- Suborder: Adephaga
- Family: Carabidae
- Tribe: Harpalini
- Subtribe: Harpalina
- Genus: Eriophonus; Tschitscherine, 1901
- Species: E. grandiceps

Binomial name
- Eriophonus grandiceps Reitter, 1900

Genus of beetle

Eriophonus grandiceps is a species of beetle in the family Carabidae, the only species in the genus Eriophonus.
