= Harpalus tiridates =

Scientific classification
- Kingdom: Animalia
- Phylum: Arthropoda
- Class: Insecta
- Order: Coleoptera
- Suborder: Adephaga
- Family: Carabidae
- Genus: Harpalus
- Species: H. tiridates

Binomial name
- Harpalus tiridates Reitter, 1900

Species of beetle

Harpalus tiridates is a species of ground beetle in the subfamily Harpalinae. It was described by Reitter in 1900.
