= Trochaloschema =

Scientific classification
- Kingdom: Animalia
- Phylum: Arthropoda
- Clade: Pancrustacea
- Class: Insecta
- Order: Coleoptera
- Suborder: Polyphaga
- Infraorder: Scarabaeiformia
- Family: Scarabaeidae
- Subfamily: Sericinae
- Tribe: Sericini
- Genus: Trochaloschema; Reitter, 1896

Genus of leaf beetles

Trochaloschema is a genus of beetles belonging to the family Scarabaeidae.

== Species ==
- Trochaloschema armeniacum Brenske, 1898
- Trochaloschema chikatunovi Nikolajev, 1987
- Trochaloschema dubium Nikolajev & Pak, 2020
- Trochaloschema iris (Semenov, 1893)
- Trochaloschema kanevskajae Nikolajev, 1987
- Trochaloschema kryzhanovskii Nikolajev, 1987
- Trochaloschema lopatini Nikolajev, 1987
- Trochaloschema medvedevi Nikolajev, 1987
- Trochaloschema michailovi Nikolajev, 1981
- Trochaloschema ravshani Ivanova & Pak, 2012
- Trochaloschema ruginota Reitter, 1896
- Trochaloschema saryhissorica Januschev, 1973
- Trochaloschema shukronajevi Nikolajev, 1987
- Trochaloschema tavildarense Nikolajev, 2002
- Trochaloschema vachshianum Nikolajev, 1987
- Trochaloschema valentini Novikov, 1999
