= Mordellistena semiferruginea =

Scientific classification
- Kingdom: Animalia
- Phylum: Arthropoda
- Class: Insecta
- Order: Coleoptera
- Suborder: Polyphaga
- Infraorder: Cucujiformia
- Family: Mordellidae
- Genus: Mordellistena
- Species: M. semiferruginea

Binomial name
- Mordellistena semiferruginea Reitter, 1911

Species of beetle

Mordellistena semiferruginea is a species of beetle in the genus Mordellistena of the family Mordellidae. It was described by Reitter in 1911.
