= Henrotius =

Scientific classification
- Kingdom: Animalia
- Phylum: Arthropoda
- Class: Insecta
- Order: Coleoptera
- Suborder: Adephaga
- Family: Carabidae
- Tribe: Pterostichini
- Subtribe: Pterostichina
- Genus: Henrotius; Jeannel, 1953
- Species: H. jordai

Binomial name
- Henrotius jordai (Reitter, 1914)

Synonyms
- Tapinoptrus Seidlitz, 1888-1891

Genus of beetles

Henrotius is a genus of carabids in the beetle family Carabidae. This genus has a single species, Henrotius jordai. It is found in Spain, including Baleares.
