= Trechus angelicae =

Scientific classification
- Kingdom: Animalia
- Phylum: Arthropoda
- Class: Insecta
- Order: Coleoptera
- Suborder: Adephaga
- Family: Carabidae
- Genus: Trechus
- Species: T. angelicae

Binomial name
- Trechus angelicae Reitter, 1892

Species of beetle

Trechus angelicae is a species of ground beetle in the subfamily Trechinae. It was described by Reitter in 1892.
