= Maladera (Cycloserica) excisiceps =

Scientific classification
- Kingdom: Animalia
- Phylum: Arthropoda
- Class: Insecta
- Order: Coleoptera
- Suborder: Polyphaga
- Infraorder: Scarabaeiformia
- Family: Scarabaeidae
- Genus: Maladera
- Species: M. excisiceps

Binomial name
- Maladera excisiceps (Reitter, 1896)

Synonyms
- Cycloserica excisiceps Reitter, 1896; Cycloserica deserta Medvedev, 1956

Species of beetle

Maladera excisiceps is a species of beetle of the family Scarabaeidae. It is found in Turkmenistan and Uzbekistan.

== Description ==
Adults reach a length of about 7 mm. They are yellowish-red and shiny. The clypeus is distinctly indented anteriorly, with a transverse line behind the unraised anterior margin, densely punctate, slightly convex in the middle. The frons is almost smooth. The pronotum is slightly projecting forward in the middle along the anterior margin, weakly rounded at the sides, very slightly curved before the posterior angles, and the surface is very finely punctate. The elytra are finely punctate in rows, the intervals smooth, but individually distinctly punctate. Only the first stria next to the suture is somewhat more distinct. The underside is shiny, less pubescent, and the rows of setae are absent on the segments.
