= Dorcadion rufogenum =

Scientific classification
- Kingdom: Animalia
- Phylum: Arthropoda
- Clade: Pancrustacea
- Class: Insecta
- Order: Coleoptera
- Suborder: Polyphaga
- Infraorder: Cucujiformia
- Family: Cerambycidae
- Genus: Dorcadion
- Species: D. rufogenum

Binomial name
- Dorcadion rufogenum Reitter, 1895

Species of beetle

Dorcadion rufogenum is a species of beetle in the family Cerambycidae. It was described by Reitter in 1895. It is known from China and Kazakhstan.

== Subspecies ==
- Dorcadion rufogenum discoflavovittatum Breuning, 1946
- Dorcadion rufogenum rufogenum Reitter, 1895
