= M. lepidus =

M. lepidus may refer to:

- Misumenops lepidus, a spider species in the genus Misumenops
- Mycetoporus lepidus, a beetle species in the genus Mycetoporus

== See also ==
- Lepidus (disambiguation)
