= Pseudaristus =

Scientific classification
- Kingdom: Animalia
- Phylum: Arthropoda
- Class: Insecta
- Order: Coleoptera
- Suborder: Adephaga
- Family: Carabidae
- Subfamily: Harpalinae
- Tribe: Harpalini
- Subtribe: Ditomina
- Genus: Pseudaristus; Reitter, 1900

Genus of beetles

Pseudaristus is a genus in the ground beetle family Carabidae. There are at least two described species in Pseudaristus.

== Species ==
These two species belong to the genus Pseudaristus:

- Pseudaristus modestus (Schaum, 1858) (Jordan, Lebanon, Syria)
- Pseudaristus punctatissimus (Baudi di Selve, 1894) (Israel, Syria)
