= Harpalus angustitarsis =

Scientific classification
- Kingdom: Animalia
- Phylum: Arthropoda
- Class: Insecta
- Order: Coleoptera
- Suborder: Adephaga
- Family: Carabidae
- Genus: Harpalus
- Species: H. angustitarsis

Binomial name
- Harpalus angustitarsis Reitter, 1877

Species of beetle

Harpalus angustitarsis is a species of ground beetle in the subfamily Harpalinae. It was described by Reitter in 1877.
