= Oroblemites =

Scientific classification
- Kingdom: Animalia
- Phylum: Arthropoda
- Class: Insecta
- Order: Coleoptera
- Suborder: Adephaga
- Family: Carabidae
- Tribe: Trechini
- Subtribe: Trechina
- Genus: Oroblemites; Ueno & Pawlowski, 1981
- Species: O. dromioides

Binomial name
- Oroblemites dromioides (Reitter, 1897)

Genus of beetles

Oroblemites is a genus in the ground beetle family Carabidae. This genus has a single species, Oroblemites dromioides. It is found in Kazakhstan, Uzbekistan, and Kyrgyzstan.
