= Speluncarius =

Scientific classification
- Kingdom: Animalia
- Phylum: Arthropoda
- Class: Insecta
- Order: Coleoptera
- Suborder: Adephaga
- Family: Carabidae
- Subfamily: Pterostichinae
- Tribe: Pterostichini
- Subtribe: Pterostichina
- Genus: Speluncarius; Reitter, 1886

Subgenera
- Elasmopterus Kraatz, 1886; Hypogearius Jeannel, 1953; Hypogium Tschitscherine, 1900; Pontotapinus B.Gueorguiev & Lohaj, 2008; Speluncarius Reitter, 1886

Genus of beetles

Speluncarius is a genus of in the beetle family Carabidae. There are more than 20 described species in Speluncarius.

== Species ==
These 27 species belong to the genus Speluncarius:

- Speluncarius albanicus (Tschitscherine, 1900) (Albania)
- Speluncarius anophthalmus (Reitter, 1886) (Bosnia-Herzegovina, former Yugoslavia)
- Speluncarius bericus Monguzzi, 1982 (Italy)
- Speluncarius biokovensis Hlavac; Lakota & Ceplik, 2016 (Croatia)
- Speluncarius boluensis Schweiger, 1966 (Turkey)
- Speluncarius breuningi Nègre, 1959 (Turkey)
- Speluncarius cyrilli (Jedlicka, 1936) (Greece)
- Speluncarius henroti Cerruti, 1973 (Greece)
- Speluncarius heracleotes Jeannel, 1953 (Turkey)
- Speluncarius leonhardi (Breit, 1914) (Greece)
- Speluncarius leonis (G.Müller, 1931) (Greece)
- Speluncarius machardi Jeanne, 1982 (Turkey)
- Speluncarius minimus Cerruti, 1977 (Turkey)
- Speluncarius minusculus Straneo, 1989 (Turkey)
- Speluncarius minutulus G.Müller, 1937 (Albania)
- Speluncarius oertzeni (Kraatz, 1886) (Greece)
- Speluncarius pasquinii Cerruti, 1973 (Greece)
- Speluncarius pesarinii Bucciarelli, 1979 (Italy)
- Speluncarius ponticus Casale & Giachino, 1991 (Turkey)
- Speluncarius rumelicus (G.Müller, 1934) (Greece)
- Speluncarius schweigeri Korge, 1971 (Turkey)
- Speluncarius seticeps (G.Müller, 1934) (Greece)
- Speluncarius setipennis (Apfelbeck, 1899) (Bosnia-Herzegovina, former Yugoslavia)
- Speluncarius speluncicola (Chaudoir, 1868) (Greece)
- Speluncarius stefani (Jurecek, 1910) (Italy)
- Speluncarius vailatii Casale & Giachino, 2013 (Greece)
- Speluncarius veluchianus (G.Müller, 1931) (Greece)
