= Trechus almonius =

Scientific classification
- Kingdom: Animalia
- Phylum: Arthropoda
- Class: Insecta
- Order: Coleoptera
- Suborder: Adephaga
- Family: Carabidae
- Genus: Trechus
- Species: T. almonius

Binomial name
- Trechus almonius Reitter, 1903

Species of beetle

Trechus almonius is a species of ground beetle in the subfamily Trechinae. It was described by Reitter in 1903.
