= Achranoxia sijesowi =

Scientific classification
- Kingdom: Animalia
- Phylum: Arthropoda
- Class: Insecta
- Order: Coleoptera
- Suborder: Polyphaga
- Infraorder: Scarabaeiformia
- Family: Melolonthidae
- Genus: Achranoxia
- Species: A. sijesowi

Binomial name
- Achranoxia sijesowi (Reitter, 1913)

Synonyms
- Ochranoxia sijesowi Reitter, 1913

Species of beetle

Achranoxia sijesowi is a species of beetle, first discovered by Edmund Reitter in 1913. No subspecies are listed at the Catalogue of Life.
