= Serica fulvopubens =

Scientific classification
- Kingdom: Animalia
- Phylum: Arthropoda
- Class: Insecta
- Order: Coleoptera
- Suborder: Polyphaga
- Infraorder: Scarabaeiformia
- Family: Scarabaeidae
- Genus: Serica
- Species: S. fulvopubens

Binomial name
- Serica fulvopubens (Reitter, 1896)

Synonyms
- Trichoserica fulvopubens Reitter, 1896

Species of beetle

Serica fulvopubens is a species of beetle of the family Scarabaeidae. It is found in Korea and the Russian Far East.

== Description ==
Adults reach a length of about 8.5–10 mm. They have a strongly shiny, brown to black, elongate oval body, densely covered with setae.
