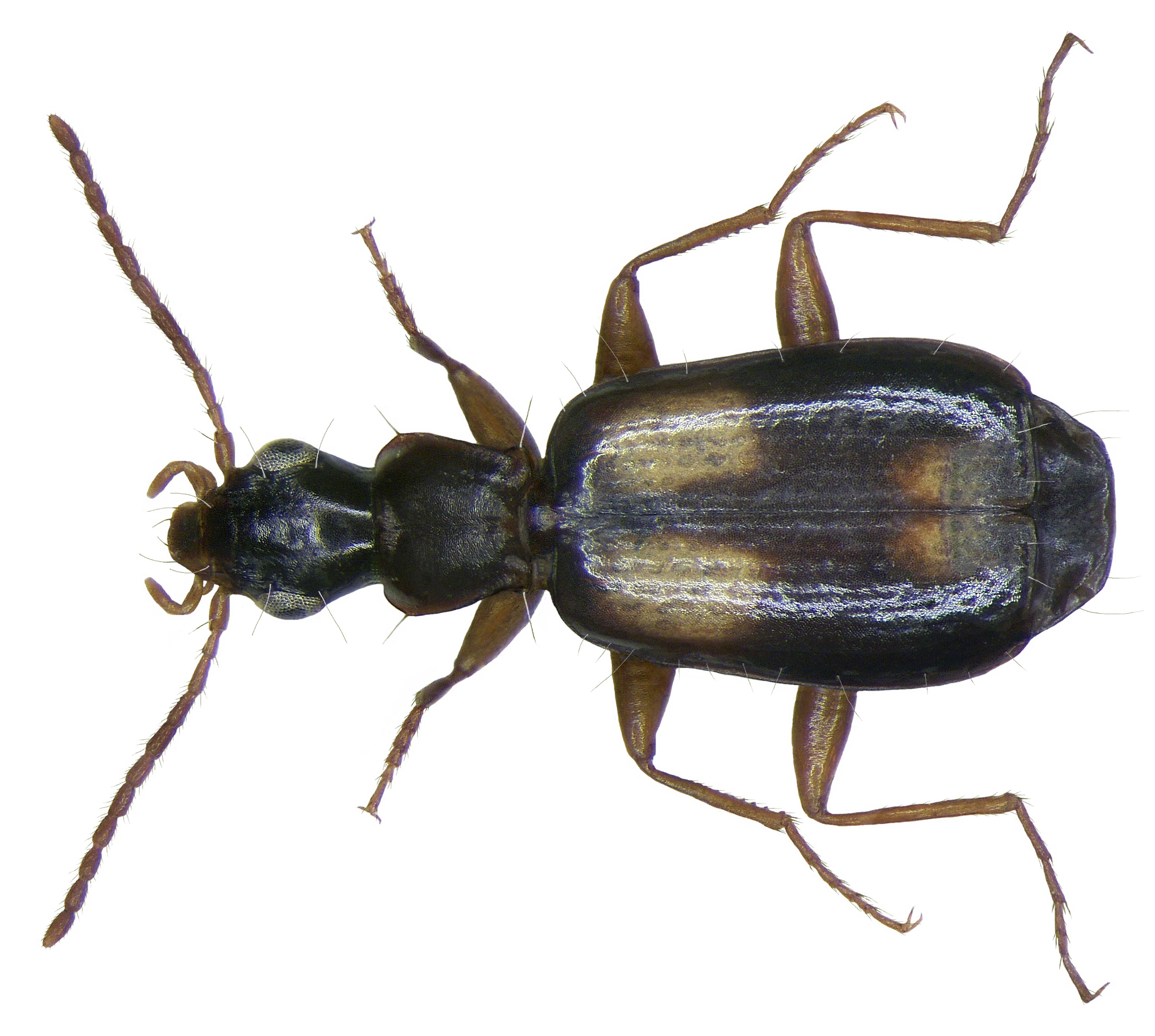
- Calodromius spilotus

Scientific classification
- Kingdom: Animalia
- Phylum: Arthropoda
- Class: Insecta
- Order: Coleoptera
- Suborder: Adephaga
- Family: Carabidae
- Subfamily: Lebiinae
- Tribe: Lebiini
- Subtribe: Dromiusina
- Genus: Calodromius; Reitter, 1905

= Calodromius =

Genus of beetles

Calodromius is a genus of ground beetle native to the Palearctic (including Europe), the Near East and North Africa. It contains the following species:

- Calodromius bifasciatus (Dejean, 1825)
- Calodromius henoni (Bedel, 1907)
- Calodromius ingens (Andrewes, 1933)
- Calodromius lebioides (Bedel, 1900)
- Calodromius mayeti (Bedel, 1907)
- Calodromius putzeysi (Paulino de Oliveira, 1876)
- Calodromius sphex (Andrewes, 1933)
- Calodromius spilotus (Illiger, 1798)
