= Maladera imbella =

Scientific classification
- Kingdom: Animalia
- Phylum: Arthropoda
- Class: Insecta
- Order: Coleoptera
- Suborder: Polyphaga
- Infraorder: Scarabaeiformia
- Family: Scarabaeidae
- Genus: Maladera
- Species: M. imbella

Binomial name
- Maladera imbella Reitter, 1898

Species of beetle

Maladera imbella is a species of beetle of the family Scarabaeidae. It is found in Afghanistan and Turkmenistan.

== Description ==
Adults reach a length of about 10 mm. They are brownish-black, dull and pruinose. The clypeus is glossy and densely and strongly punctate, with the anterior margin straight and narrowly upturned. The pronotum is very finely, scarcely visibly punctate and the scutellum is triangular and finely punctate. The elytra are shallowly and indistinctly punctate. The pygidium is indistinctly punctate and, like the abdomen, somewhat lighter coloured.
