= Eucarterus =

Scientific classification
- Kingdom: Animalia
- Phylum: Arthropoda
- Class: Insecta
- Order: Coleoptera
- Suborder: Adephaga
- Family: Carabidae
- Subfamily: Harpalinae
- Tribe: Harpalini
- Subtribe: Ditomina
- Genus: Eucarterus; Reitter, 1900
- Species: E. sparsutus

Binomial name
- Eucarterus sparsutus (Reitter, 1898)

Species of beetle

Eucarterus is a genus in the ground beetle family Carabidae. This genus has a single species, Eucarterus sparsutus. It is found in the Palearctic.
