= Maladera armeniaca =

Scientific classification
- Kingdom: Animalia
- Phylum: Arthropoda
- Clade: Pancrustacea
- Class: Insecta
- Order: Coleoptera
- Suborder: Polyphaga
- Infraorder: Scarabaeiformia
- Family: Scarabaeidae
- Genus: Maladera
- Species: M. armeniaca

Binomial name
- Maladera armeniaca Reitter, 1896

Species of beetle

Maladera armeniaca is a species of beetle of the family Scarabaeidae. It is found in Armenia and Iran.

== Description ==
Adults reach a length of about 8.5–9.7 mm. They have a reddish-brown to light chestnut-brown, slender, rather shiny body. The forehead is dark brown, with a slight metallic sheen. The antennae and hairs on the underside are yellowish-brown.
