= Phytoecia antoniae =

Scientific classification
- Kingdom: Animalia
- Phylum: Arthropoda
- Class: Insecta
- Order: Coleoptera
- Suborder: Polyphaga
- Infraorder: Cucujiformia
- Family: Cerambycidae
- Genus: Phytoecia
- Species: P. antoniae

Binomial name
- Phytoecia antoniae (Reitter, 1889)

Synonyms
- Conizonia antoniae (Reitter) Breuning, 1954; Coptosia antoniae (Reitter, 1889)

Species of beetle

Phytoecia antoniae is a species of beetle in the family Cerambycidae. It was first described by Edmund Reitter in 1889.
