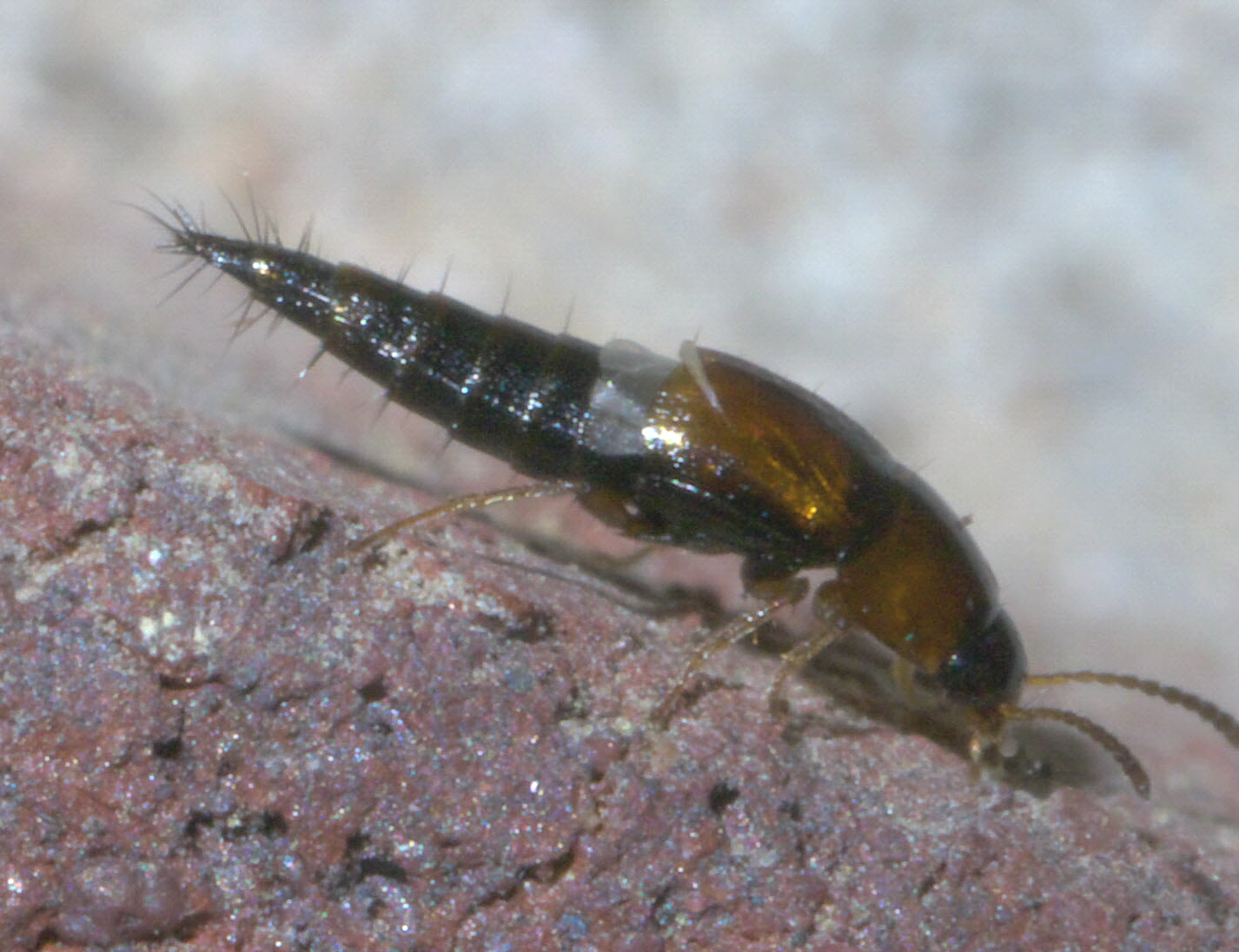

Scientific classification
- Domain: Eukaryota
- Kingdom: Animalia
- Phylum: Arthropoda
- Class: Insecta
- Order: Coleoptera
- Suborder: Polyphaga
- Infraorder: Staphyliniformia
- Family: Staphylinidae
- Tribe: Tachyporini
- Genus: Tachyporus; Gravenhorst, 1802

= Tachyporus =

Genus of beetles

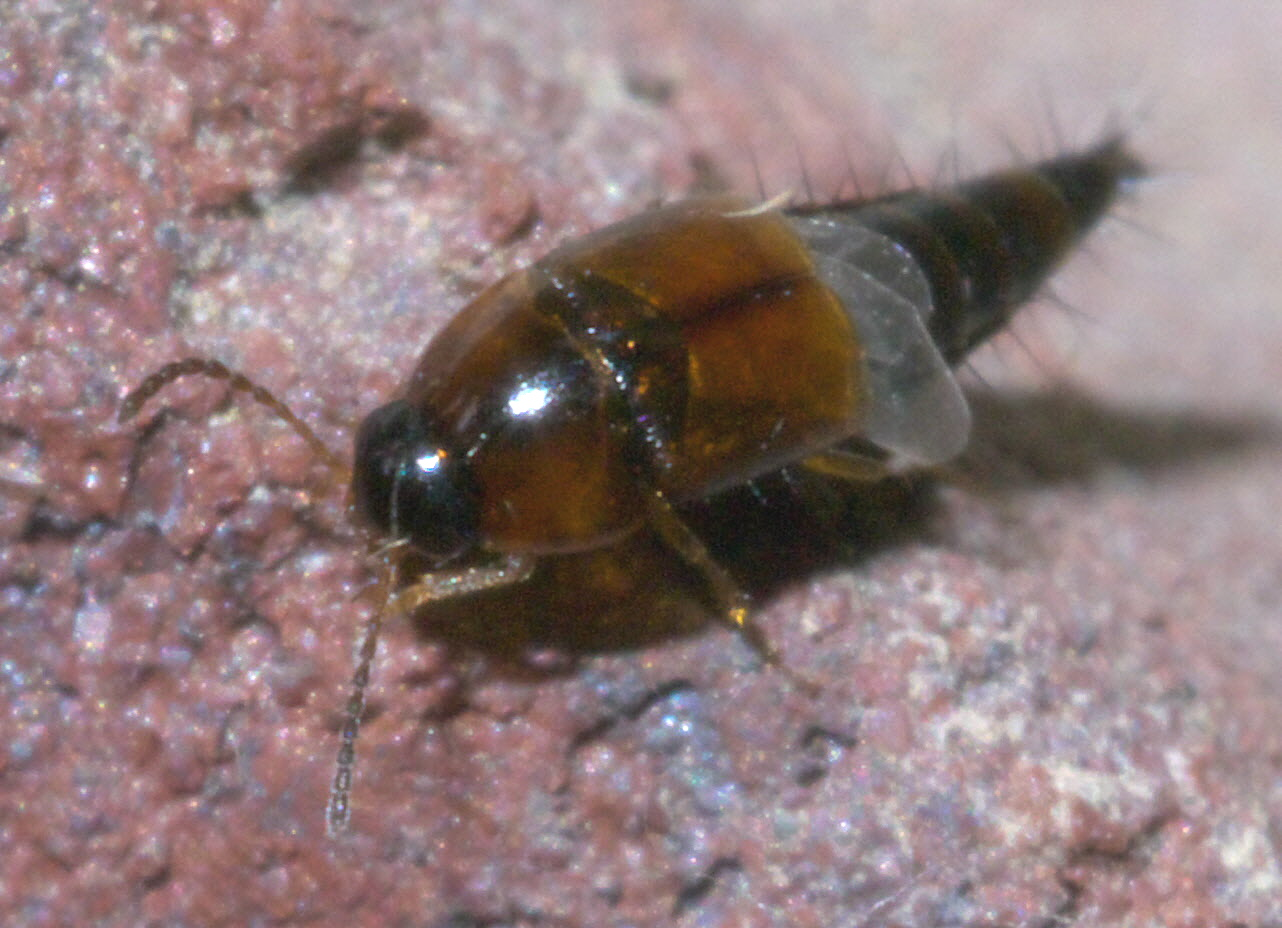
Tachyporus, Size: about 4 mm

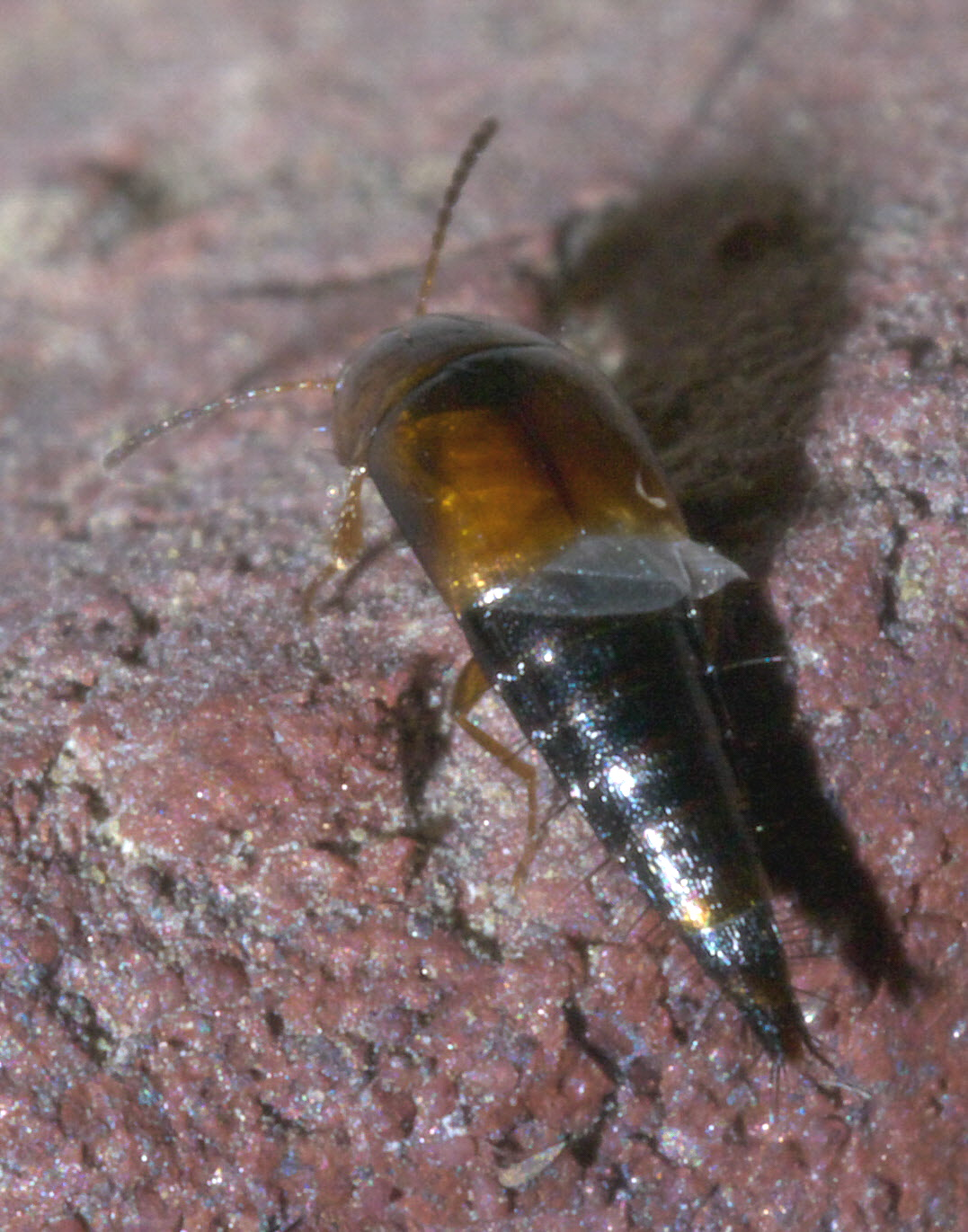
Tachyporus

Tachyporus is a genus of rove beetle in the tribe Tachyporini. It is the type genus of both the tribe Tachyporini and the subfamily Tachyporinae.

The Global Biodiversity Information Facility reports 40 species in this genus, with most collection and observation activity from Europe, but also including records from North America, Africa, Asia, Australia, and New Zealand.
