= Trochaloschema ruginota =

Scientific classification
- Kingdom: Animalia
- Phylum: Arthropoda
- Class: Insecta
- Order: Coleoptera
- Suborder: Polyphaga
- Infraorder: Scarabaeiformia
- Family: Scarabaeidae
- Genus: Trochaloschema
- Species: T. ruginota

Binomial name
- Trochaloschema ruginota Reitter, 1896

Species of beetle

Trochaloschema ruginota is a species of beetle of the family Scarabaeidae. It is found in Kyrgyzstan.

== Description ==
Adults reach a length of about 10 mm. They have an oval, glabrous, black, opaque body.
