= Harpalus setiporus =

Scientific classification
- Kingdom: Animalia
- Phylum: Arthropoda
- Class: Insecta
- Order: Coleoptera
- Suborder: Adephaga
- Family: Carabidae
- Genus: Harpalus
- Species: H. setiporus

Binomial name
- Harpalus setiporus Reitter, 1894

Species of beetle

Harpalus setiporus is a species of ground beetle in the subfamily Harpalinae. It was described by Reitter in 1894.
