= Serica heydeni =

Scientific classification
- Kingdom: Animalia
- Phylum: Arthropoda
- Class: Insecta
- Order: Coleoptera
- Suborder: Polyphaga
- Infraorder: Scarabaeiformia
- Family: Scarabaeidae
- Genus: Serica
- Species: S. heydeni

Binomial name
- Serica heydeni (Reitter, 1896)

Synonyms
- Trichoserica heydeni Reitter, 1896; Podoserica reitteri Breit, 1912

Species of beetle

Serica heydeni is a species of beetle of the family Scarabaeidae. It is found in China (Gansu, Henan, Hubei, Ningxia, Qinghai, Shaanxi, Sichuan).

== Description ==
Adults reach a length of about 5.5 mm. They are brown, and silky underneath, but with shiny legs. Above, there are shorter and stronger white hairs and setae in the punctures. The clypeus is almost square, distinctly emarginate at the front, granularly punctured, finely pubescent. The frons is broad and with fine, greyish erect hairs. The pronotum is very transverse, not projecting in the middle at the anterior margin, therefore evenly emarginate, with sharp anterior and posterior angles. The surface is irregularly, patchily covered with white hairs. The scutellum is small and narrow. The elytra are very dull, therefore the regular rows of punctures are very indistinct. The intervals are somewhat convex, faintly darker-spotted. Except for the spots, the elytra are fairly evenly, but extensively covered with fine and stronger white hairs.
