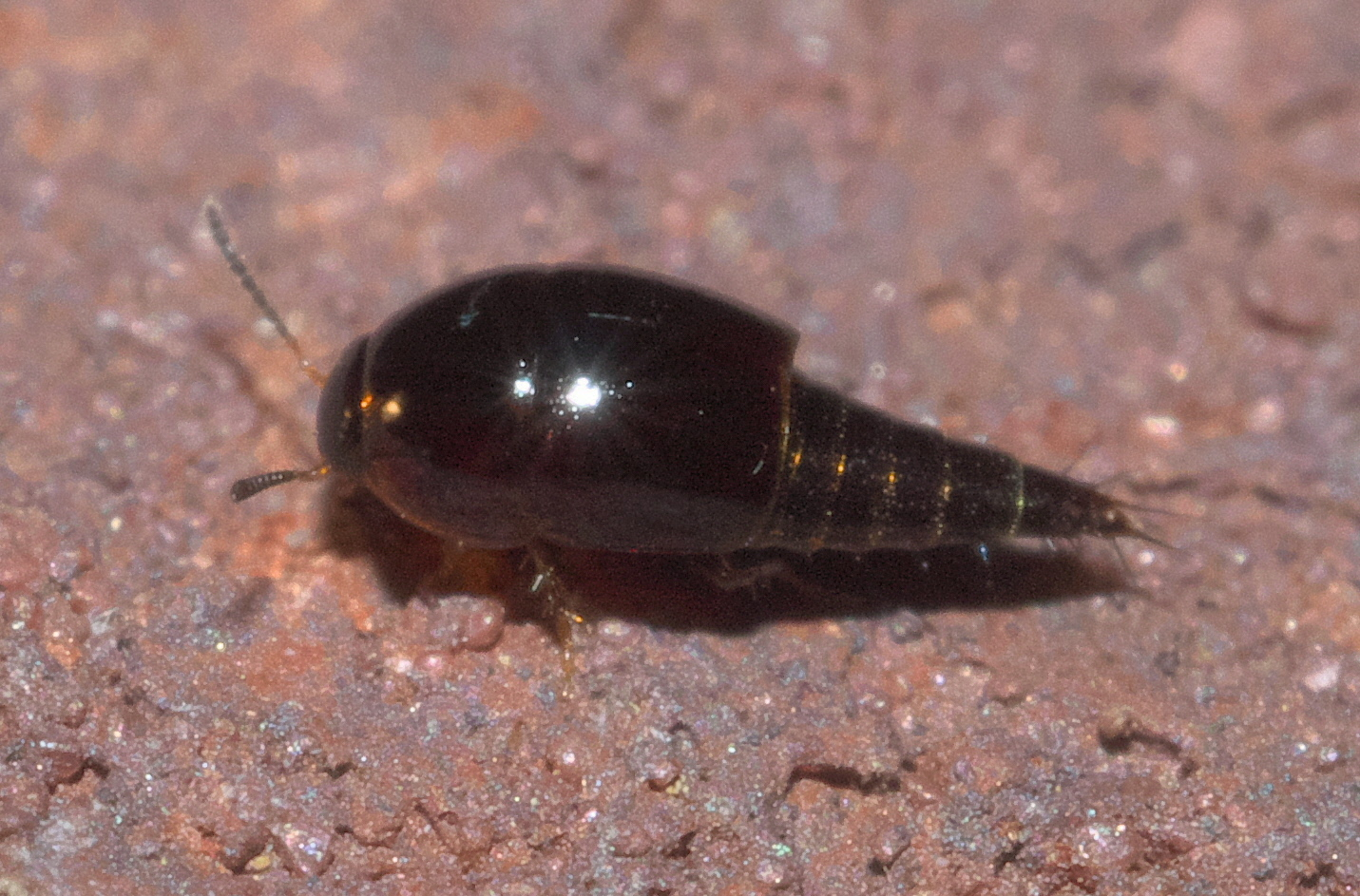
- Coproporus, species unspecified

Scientific classification
- Kingdom: Animalia
- Phylum: Arthropoda
- Clade: Pancrustacea
- Class: Insecta
- Order: Coleoptera
- Suborder: Polyphaga
- Infraorder: Staphyliniformia
- Family: Staphylinidae
- Subfamily: Tachyporinae
- Tribe: Vatesini; Seevers, 1958

= Vatesini =

Tribe of beetles

Vatesini is a tribe of beetles belonging to the family Staphylinidae.

It contains ten genera:

- Cilea Jacquelin du Val, 1856
- Cileoporus Campbell, 1994
- Coproporus Kraatz, 1857
- Coprotachinus Cameron, 1933
- Mimocyptus Cameron, 1919
- †Procileoporus Yamamoto, 2016
- Tachinoporus Cameron, 1928
- Tachinoproporus Cameron, 1928
- Termitoplus Silvestri, 1946
- Vatesus Sharp, 1876
