= Bobitobus =

Scientific classification
- Kingdom: Animalia
- Phylum: Arthropoda
- Clade: Pancrustacea
- Class: Insecta
- Order: Coleoptera
- Suborder: Polyphaga
- Infraorder: Staphyliniformia
- Family: Staphylinidae
- Subfamily: Mycetoporinae
- Genus: Bobitobus; Tottenham, 1939

Genus of beetles

Bobitobus is a genus of rove beetles in the subfamily Mycetoporinae. It was first described in 1939 by Tottenham. There are 34 currently accepted species.

== Species ==
- Bobitobus arcuatus
- Bobitobus cinctus
- Bobitobus copulatus
- Bobitobus daimio
- Bobitobus distinctus
- Bobitobus elegantulus
- Bobitobus femoralis
- Bobitobus fungicola
- Bobitobus idahoae
- Bobitobus imitator
- Bobitobus indubius
- Bobitobus irregularis
- Bobitobus kantschiederi
- Bobitobus kelleyi
- Bobitobus longiceps
- Bobitobus lunulatus
- Bobitobus maacki
- Bobitobus nigricollis
- Bobitobus niponensis
- Bobitobus niponensis
- Bobitobus notabilis
- Bobitobus obsoletus
- Bobitobus oregonus
- Bobitobus praenobilis
- Bobitobus principalis
- Bobitobus pulchellus
- Bobitobus puncticeps
- Bobitobus quaesitor
- Bobitobus rostratus
- Bobitobus ruficeps
- Bobitobus semirufus
- Bobitobus speciosus
- Bobitobus takashii
- Bobitobus vandykei
- Bobitobus varigatus
