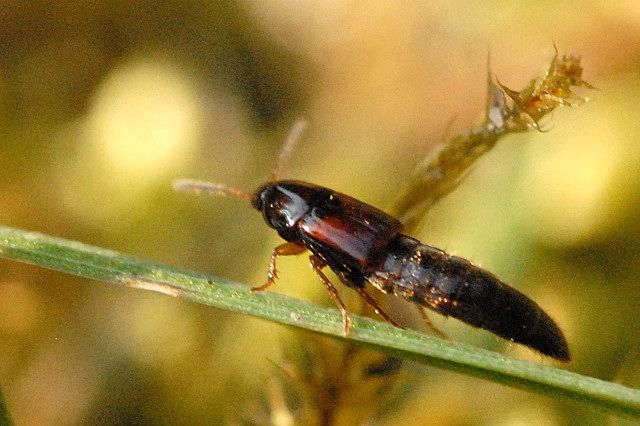
- Mycetoporus longulus

Scientific classification
- Kingdom: Animalia
- Phylum: Arthropoda
- Clade: Pancrustacea
- Class: Insecta
- Order: Coleoptera
- Suborder: Polyphaga
- Infraorder: Staphyliniformia
- Family: Staphylinidae
- Subfamily: Mycetoporinae; Thomson, 1859

= Mycetoporinae =

Subfamily of rove beetles

Mycetoporinae is a subfamily of rove beetles in the family Staphylinidae. It was first described by C. G. Thomson in 1859. There are 451 species, 15 subspecies, split between 16 genera.

== Genera and species ==
- Bobitobus
- Bolitobius
- Bolitopunctus
  - Bolitopunctus muricatulus
  - Bolitopunctus punctatissimus
- Bryophacis
- Bryoporus
- Canariobolitobius
  - Canariobolitobius filicornis
- Carphacis
- Cuneocharis
  - Cuneocharis elongata
- Glabrimycetoporus
  - Glabrimycetoporus amoenus
- Ischnosoma
- Lordithon
- Mycetoporus
- Neobolitobius
  - Neobolitobius varians
- Parabolitobius
- Ryvkinius
  - Ryvkinius gracilis
- Undiatina
  - Undiatina pilosa
