= Phytoecia pici =

Scientific classification
- Kingdom: Animalia
- Phylum: Arthropoda
- Class: Insecta
- Order: Coleoptera
- Suborder: Polyphaga
- Infraorder: Cucujiformia
- Family: Cerambycidae
- Genus: Phytoecia
- Species: P. pici

Binomial name
- Phytoecia pici Reitter, 1892

Synonyms
- Musaria (Semiangusta) pici (Reitter) Pic, 1892

Species of beetle

Phytoecia pici is a species of beetle in the family Cerambycidae. It was described by Edmund Reitter in 1892. It is known from Iraq, Iran, and possibly also Turkey.
