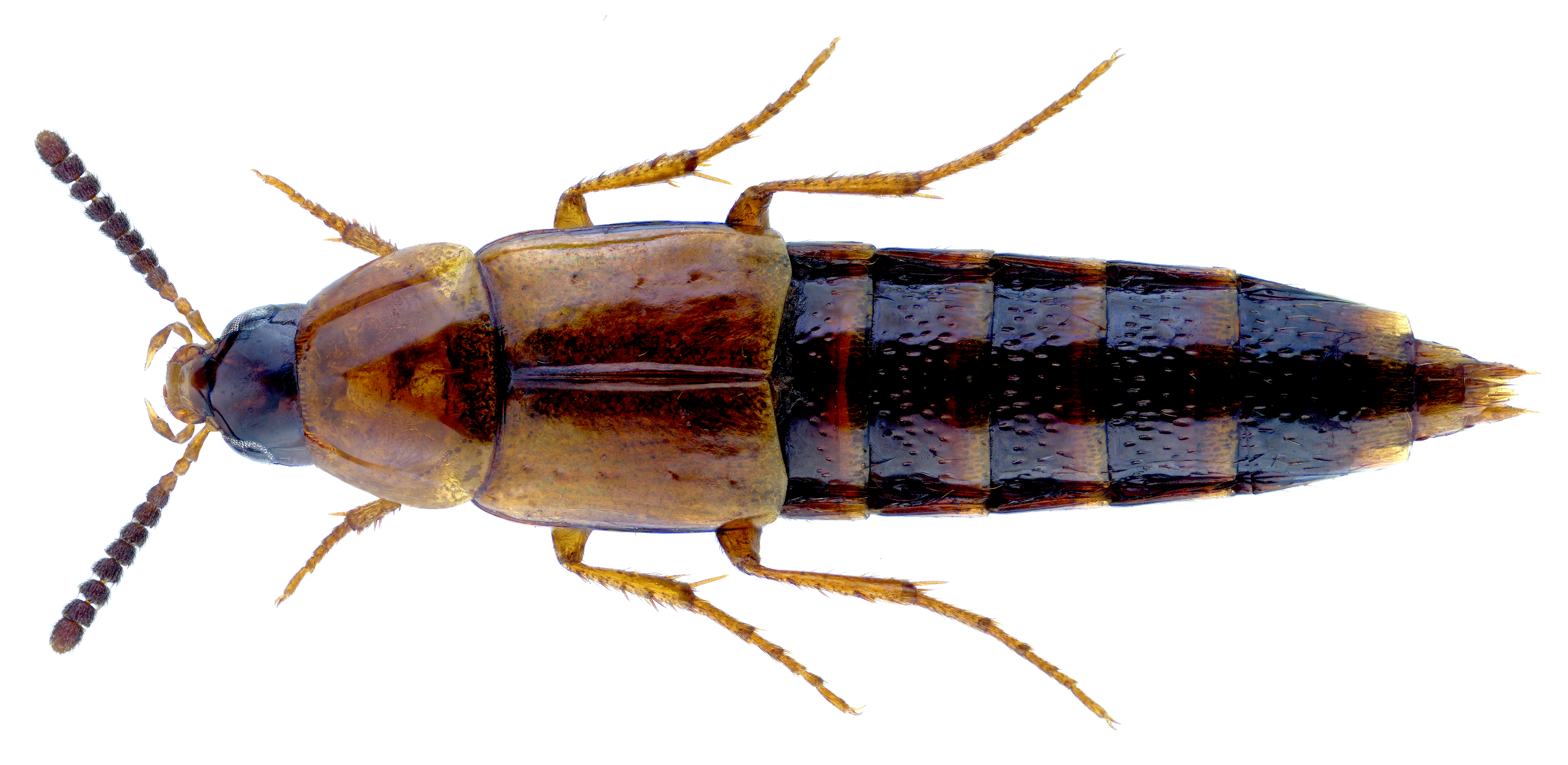
- Bryophacis crassicornis

Scientific classification
- Kingdom: Animalia
- Phylum: Arthropoda
- Clade: Pancrustacea
- Class: Insecta
- Order: Coleoptera
- Suborder: Polyphaga
- Infraorder: Staphyliniformia
- Family: Staphylinidae
- Subfamily: Mycetoporinae
- Genus: Bryophacis; Reitter, 1909

= Bryophacis =

Genus of beetles

Bryophacis is a genus of beetles belonging to the family Staphylinidae.

The species of this genus are found in Europe and North America.

Species:

- Bryophacis arcticus Campbell, 1993
- Bryophacis biseriatus (Mannerheim, 1846)
- Bryophacis crassicornis (Mäklin, 1847)
- Bryophacis discalis (Hatch, 1957)
