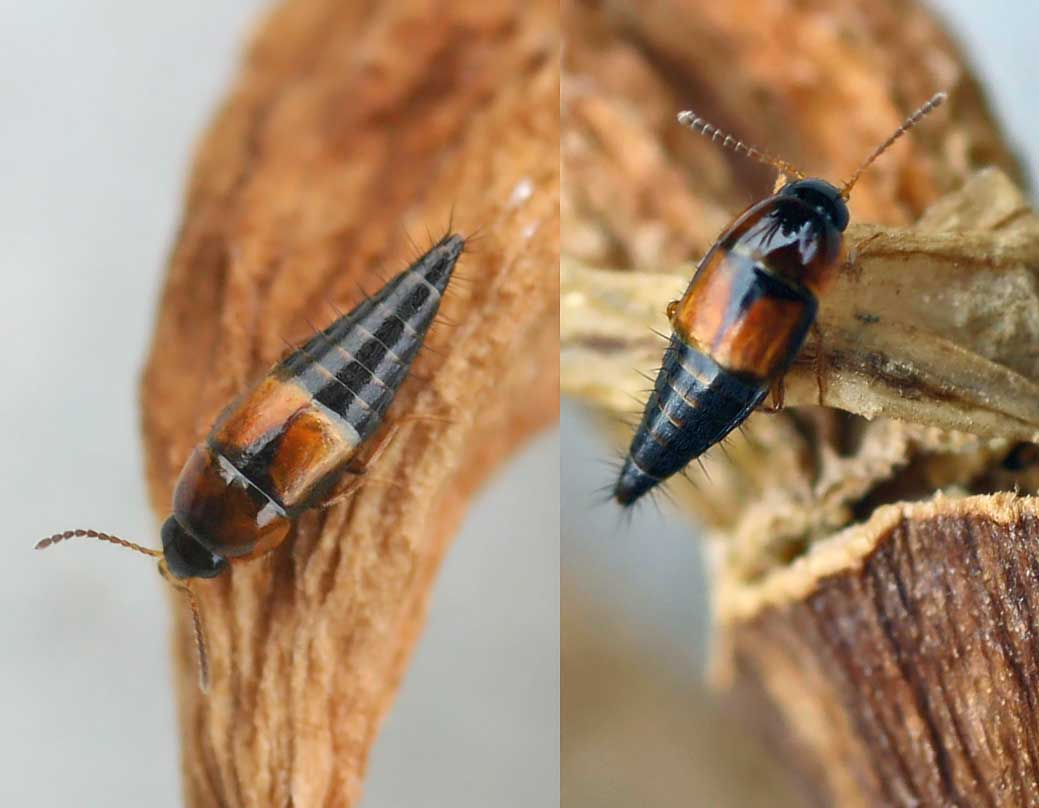
- Tachyporus hypnorum

Scientific classification
- Kingdom: Animalia
- Phylum: Arthropoda
- Clade: Pancrustacea
- Class: Insecta
- Order: Coleoptera
- Suborder: Polyphaga
- Infraorder: Staphyliniformia
- Family: Staphylinidae
- Subfamily: Tachyporinae
- Tribe: Tachyporini; MacLeay, 1825

= Tachyporini =

Tribe of beetles

Tachyporini is a tribe of rove beetles in the subfamily Tachyporinae. It contains the genera Tachyporus and Tachinus, among others.
