= Trochaloschema armeniacum =

Scientific classification
- Kingdom: Animalia
- Phylum: Arthropoda
- Class: Insecta
- Order: Coleoptera
- Suborder: Polyphaga
- Infraorder: Scarabaeiformia
- Family: Scarabaeidae
- Genus: Trochaloschema
- Species: T. armeniacum

Binomial name
- Trochaloschema armeniacum Brenske, 1898

Synonyms
- Trochaloschema medusa Reitter, 1901; Trochaloschema armeniaca

Species of beetle

Trochaloschema armeniacum is a species of beetle of the family Scarabaeidae. It is found in Tajikistan.

== Description ==
Adults reach a length of about 10 mm. They have a short-oval, pitch-brown (the elytra are the darkest), dull body, without an opalescent sheen. The clypeus is only slightly tapered, almost straight anteriorly, slightly margined, not margined laterally, behind the anterior margin with a smooth transverse impression, followed by a transverse, almost smooth convexity, behind which densely but indistinctly wrinkled-punctate, with short bristle-like structures. The frons is shortly convex, punctate and metallic, and with the vertex smooth. The pronotum is short, evenly rounded at the sides, with obtuse posterior angles and strongly projecting anterior angles, the anterior margin not projecting in the middle, broadly flat, shiny, the posterior margin also smooth, the surface deeply and coarsely punctate, the intervals wrinkled. The elytra are very densely punctate in the striae, less so on the convex intervals. At the base, the intervals are slightly tuberculate, and at the apex is completely flattened. The pygidium is tapered, with short but strong setae.
