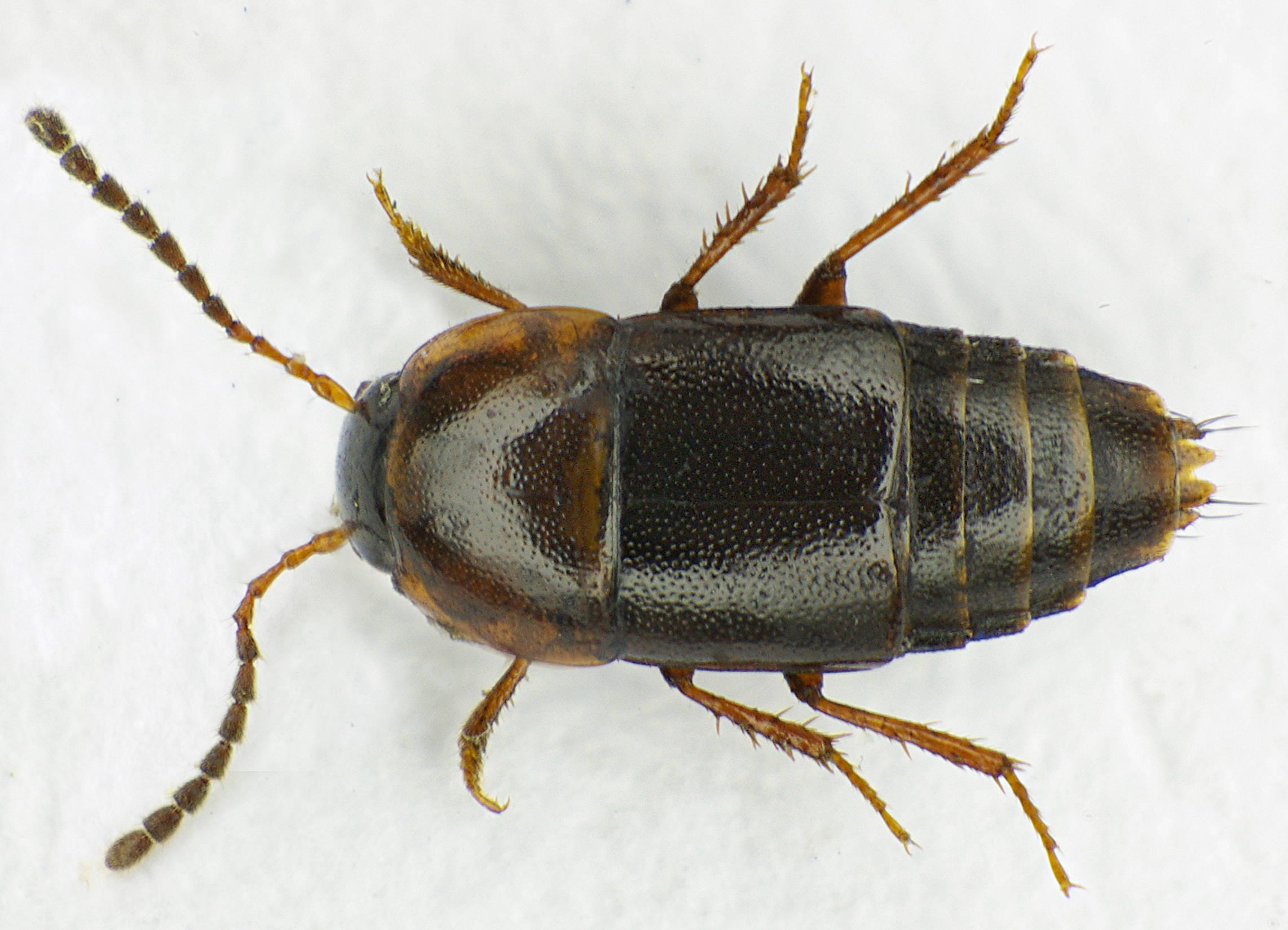

Scientific classification
- Domain: Eukaryota
- Kingdom: Animalia
- Phylum: Arthropoda
- Class: Insecta
- Order: Coleoptera
- Suborder: Polyphaga
- Infraorder: Staphyliniformia
- Family: Staphylinidae
- Genus: Tachinus
- Species: T. corticinus

Binomial name
- Tachinus corticinus Gravenhorst, 1802

= Tachinus corticinus =

Species of beetle

Tachinus corticinus is a species of crab-like rove beetle in the family Staphylinidae.
