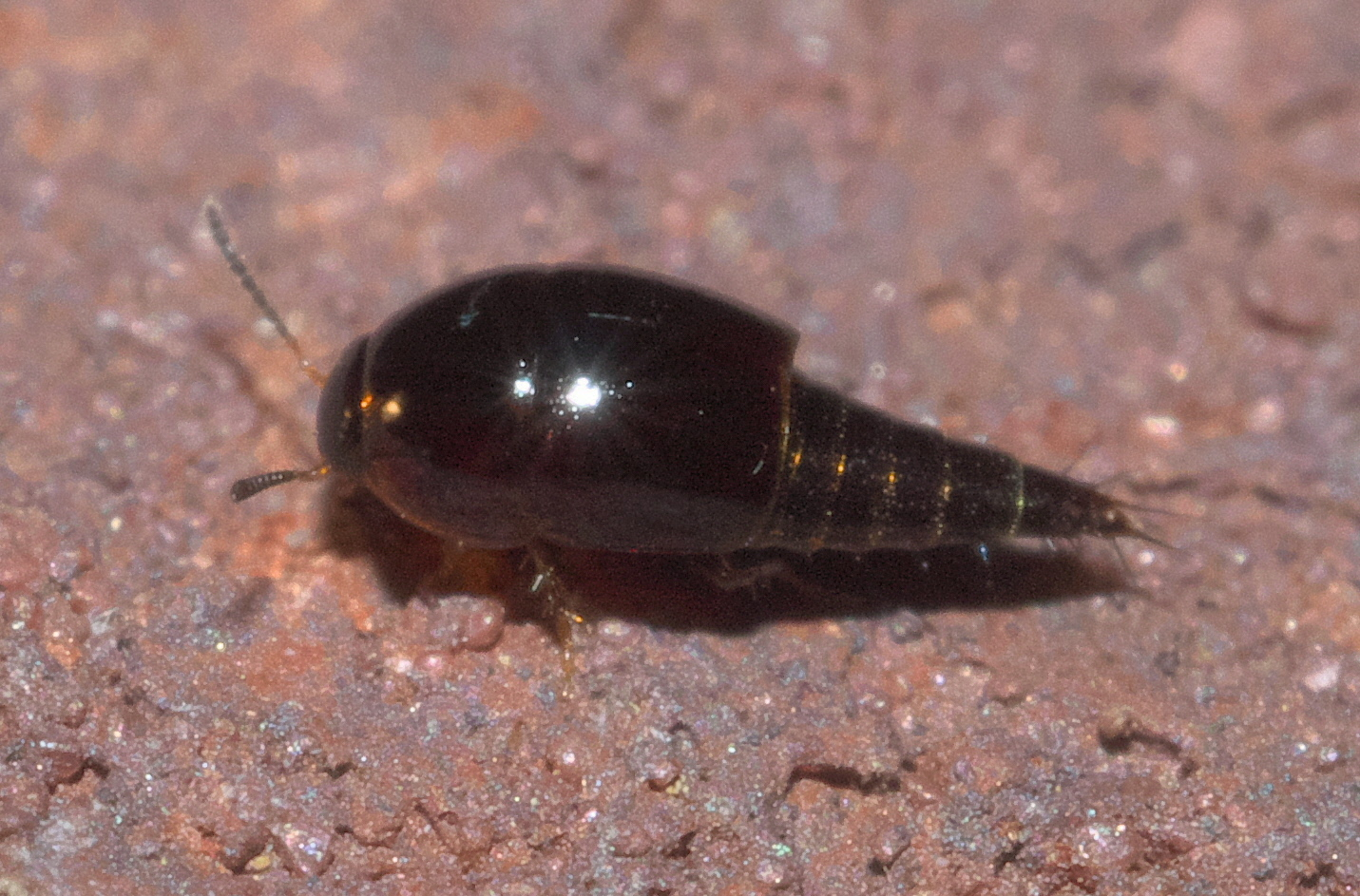

Scientific classification
- Kingdom: Animalia
- Phylum: Arthropoda
- Class: Insecta
- Order: Coleoptera
- Suborder: Polyphaga
- Infraorder: Staphyliniformia
- Family: Staphylinidae
- Tribe: Vatesini
- Genus: Coproporus; Kraatz, 1857

= Coproporus =

Genus of beetles

Coproporus is a genus of beetles belonging to the family Staphylinidae.

The genus has cosmopolitan distribution.

Species:

- Coproporus abessinus Bernhauer, 1915
- Coproporus albicornis (Sahlberg, 1844)
