= Lordithon lunulatus =

Scientific classification
- Kingdom: Animalia
- Phylum: Arthropoda
- Clade: Pancrustacea
- Class: Insecta
- Order: Coleoptera
- Suborder: Polyphaga
- Infraorder: Staphyliniformia
- Family: Staphylinidae
- Genus: Lordithon
- Species: L. lunulatus

Binomial name
- Lordithon lunulatus (Linnaeus, 1760)

Species of beetle

Lordithon lunulatus is a rove beetle. It is a common insect in Europe. The mature adult is about 5 millimetres long. It has distinctively patterned elytra – these are shiny black with pale patches at the outer front corners, and a pale margin at the rear. The thorax is broader at the rear, narrower at the front, shining and reddish brown. The head is long and shiny. The abdomen is largely reddish-brown, but the two rear segments are black. It is covered is pale hairs, and has black setae on its lateral margins. The legs are yellow, and the tarsi are elongated, with five segments on each. The antennae have eleven segments – the first to the fourth and the last are yellow; the others are black.

The adult is found in bracket fungi in summer and autumn, where it preys on other insects that eat the fungus.

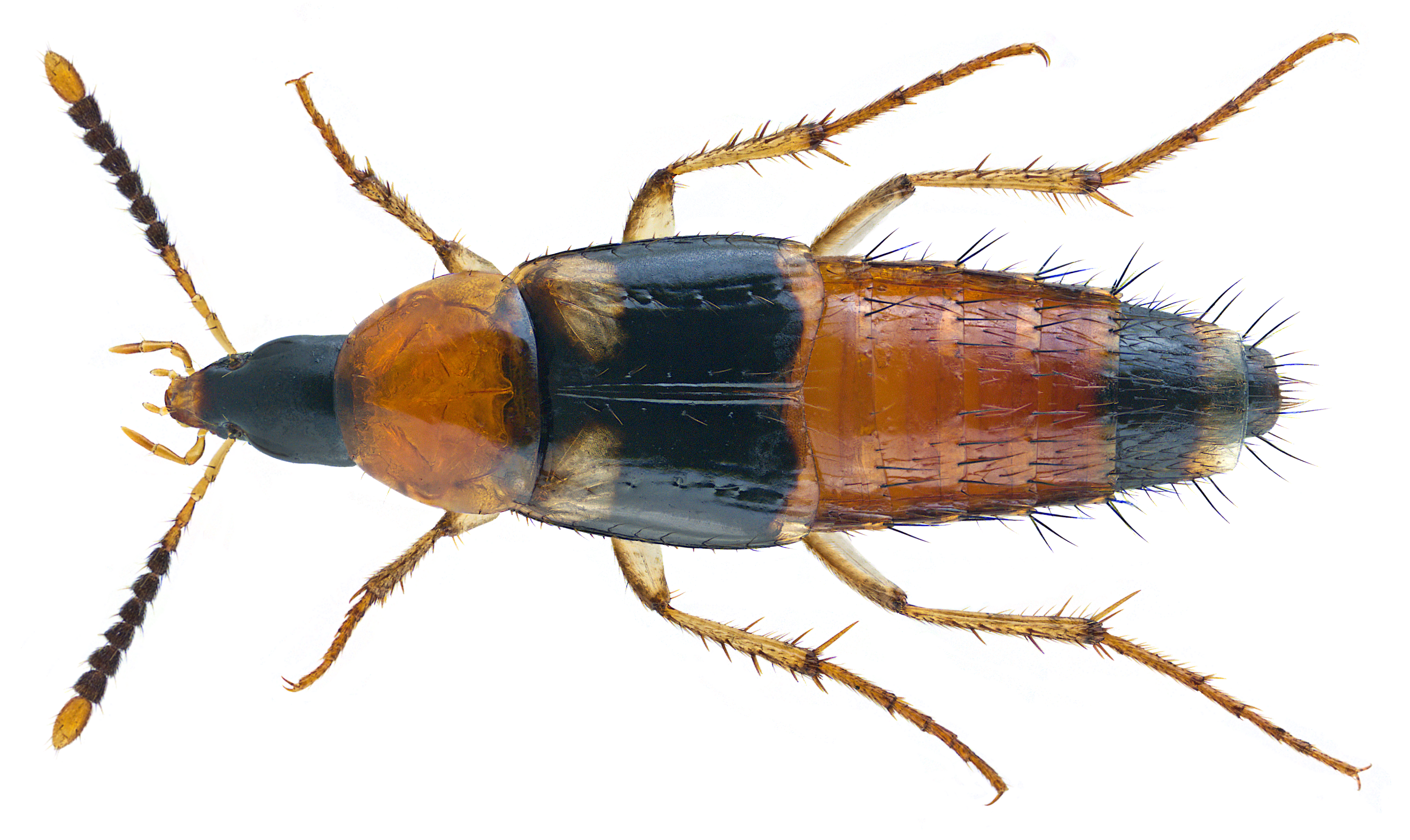
