= Trochaloschema ravshani =

Scientific classification
- Kingdom: Animalia
- Phylum: Arthropoda
- Class: Insecta
- Order: Coleoptera
- Suborder: Polyphaga
- Infraorder: Scarabaeiformia
- Family: Scarabaeidae
- Genus: Trochaloschema
- Species: T. ravshani

Binomial name
- Trochaloschema ravshani Ivanova & Pak, 2012

Species of beetle

Trochaloschema ravshani is a species of beetle of the family Scarabaeidae. It is found in Tajikistan.

== Description ==
Adults reach a length of about 6.9–10.5 mm. They have a black, short, oval, convex, with an iridescent sheen. The pronotum has a thin longitudinal median stripe without dots, while the rest is punctate with small, irregularly scattered punctures. The lateral margins of the pronotum have light-brown setae of varying lengths. The elytral striae consist of slightly indented puncture rows.
