= Bolitobius =

Scientific classification
- Kingdom: Animalia
- Phylum: Arthropoda
- Clade: Pancrustacea
- Class: Insecta
- Order: Coleoptera
- Suborder: Polyphaga
- Infraorder: Staphyliniformia
- Family: Staphylinidae
- Subfamily: Mycetoporinae
- Genus: Bolitobius; Leach, 1819

Genus of beetles

Bolitobius is a genus of beetles belonging to the family Staphylinidae.

The genus was first described by Leach in 1819.

The species of this genus are found in Eurasia and Northern America.

Species:

- Bolitobius castaneus
- Bolitobius cingulatus
- Bolitobius formosus
