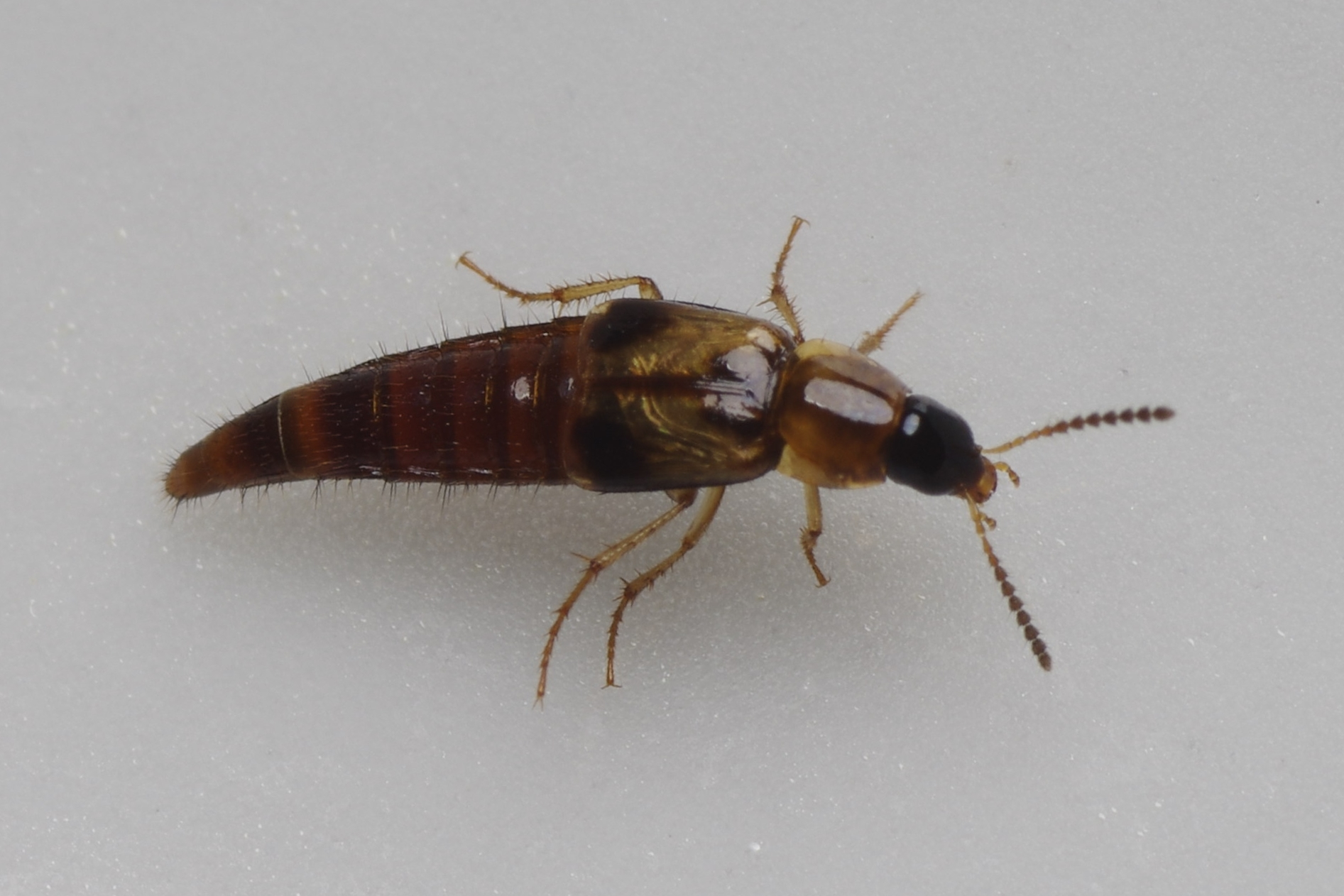

Scientific classification
- Kingdom: Animalia
- Phylum: Arthropoda
- Clade: Pancrustacea
- Class: Insecta
- Order: Coleoptera
- Suborder: Polyphaga
- Infraorder: Staphyliniformia
- Family: Staphylinidae
- Subfamily: Mycetoporinae
- Genus: Lordithon; Thomson, 1859

= Lordithon =

Genus of beetles

Lordithon is a genus of beetles belonging to the family Staphylinidae.

The species of this genus are found in Eurasia, America, Australia.

Species:

- Lordithon abditus Herman, 2001
- Lordithon aitai Li and Ohbayashi, 1997
- Lordithon affinis (Cameron, 1950)
- Lordithon arcuatus (Solsky, 1871)
- Lordithon bicolor (Gravenhorst, 1806)
- Lordithon daimio (Sharp, 1888)
- Lordithon japonicus (Sharp, 1874)
- Lordithon lunulatus (Linnaeus, 1760)
- Lordithon principalis (Sharp, 1888)
