= Bolitopunctus =

Scientific classification
- Kingdom: Animalia
- Phylum: Arthropoda
- Clade: Pancrustacea
- Class: Insecta
- Order: Coleoptera
- Suborder: Polyphaga
- Infraorder: Staphyliniformia
- Family: Staphylinidae
- Subfamily: Mycetoporinae
- Genus: Bolitopunctus; Campbell, 1993

Bolitopunctus is genus of rove beetles in the subfamily Mycetoporinae. It was first described in 1993 by Campbell. There are 2 accepted species. Bolitopunctus beetles are typically around 2-3mm long, and 1mm wide.

== Species ==
- Bolitopunctus muricatulus
- Bolitopunctus puntatissimus
