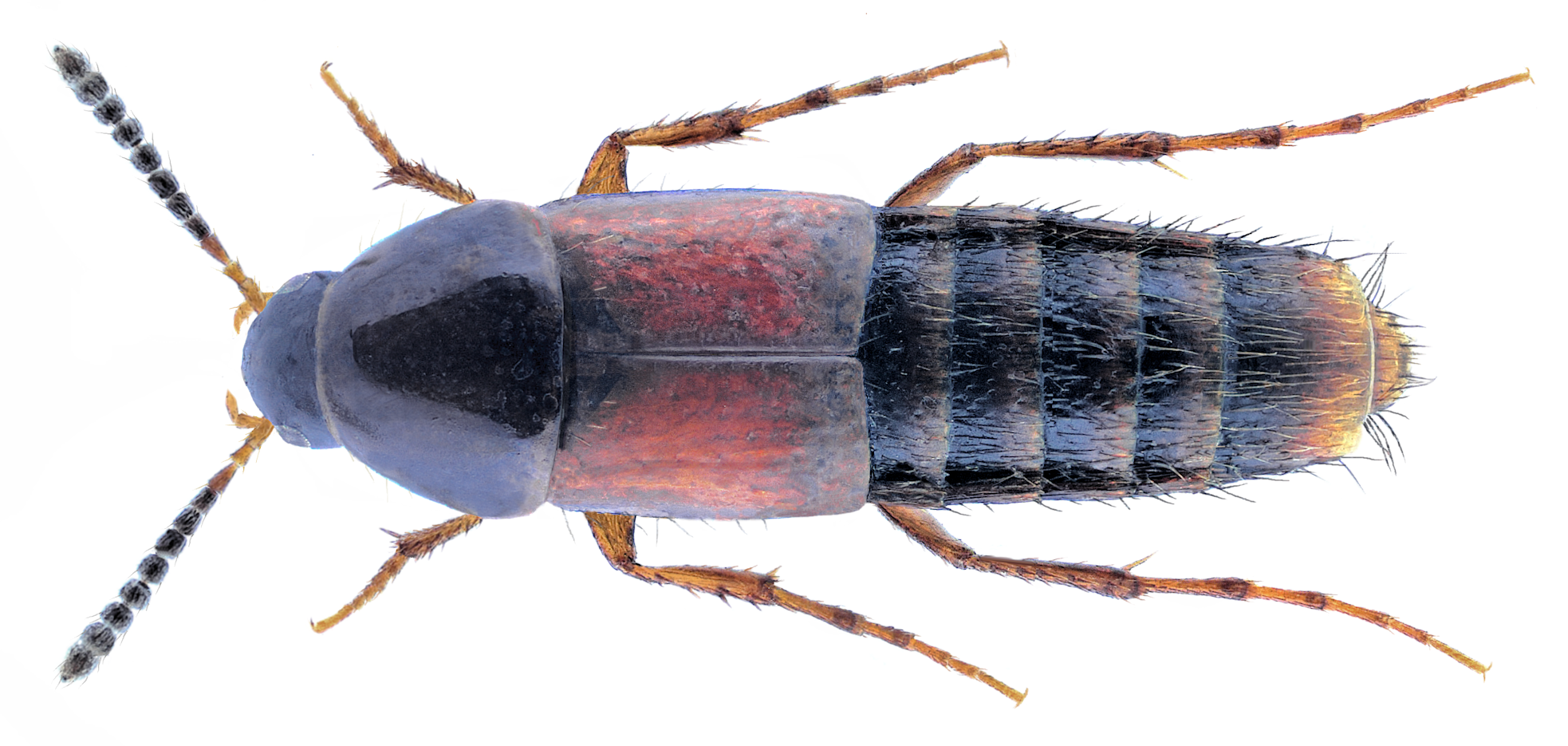
- Bryoporus cernuus

Scientific classification
- Kingdom: Animalia
- Phylum: Arthropoda
- Clade: Pancrustacea
- Class: Insecta
- Order: Coleoptera
- Suborder: Polyphaga
- Infraorder: Staphyliniformia
- Family: Staphylinidae
- Subfamily: Mycetoporinae
- Genus: Bryoporus; Kraatz, 1857

= Bryoporus =

Genus of beetles

Bryoporus is a genus of beetles belonging to the family Staphylinidae.

The genus was first described by Kraatz in 1957.

The genus has almost cosmopolitan distribution.

Species:

- Bryoporus cernuus (Gravenhorst, 1806)
