= Fredrik Wilhelm Mäklin =

Finnish zoologist (1821–1883)

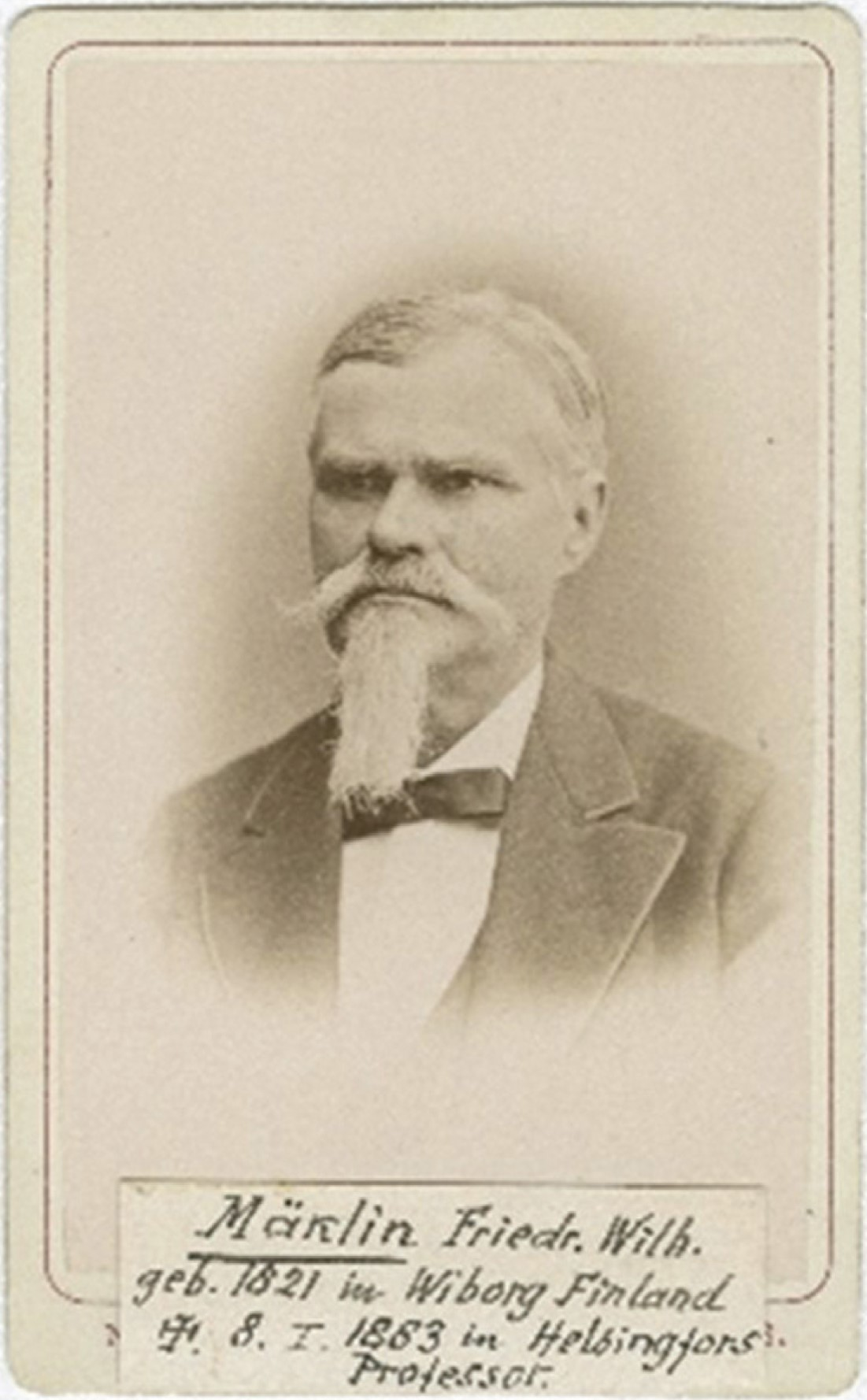

Fredrik Wilhelm Mäklin (May 26, 1821 – January 8, 1883) was a Finnish zoologist and a professor at the University of Helsinki. He took a special interest in the beetles of the region, taking an interest in geographic distributions and was opposed to ideas of Darwinian evolution.

Mäklin was born in Joutseno and went to study zoology at the Imperial Alexander University of Finland in Helsinki in 1839 under C. R. Sahlberg. He received a doctorate in 1853 and became a docent in 1855. He became an assistant professor in 1859 working with Alexander von Nordmann. After Nordmann's death in 1866 he competed and became a professor alongside Anders Johan Malmgren who was favoured by most students over the more pedantic Mäklin. He collaborated on entomology with Carl Gustaf Mannerheim and worked on beetles particularly in the Staphylinidae, Cantharidae and Mordellidae. Mäklin examined the geographical distributions of various beetles and found several that were also found in North America. In the 1860s he declared that there was no natural boundary for the species of Finnish fauna and flora claiming that the fauna of the region was a combination of European and Siberian elements. In 1867 he published a monograph on the genus Strongylium. He attacked J. R. Sahlberg and the ideas of Darwin. He died in Helsinki and was succeeded by Johan Axel Palmén as professor of zoology.
