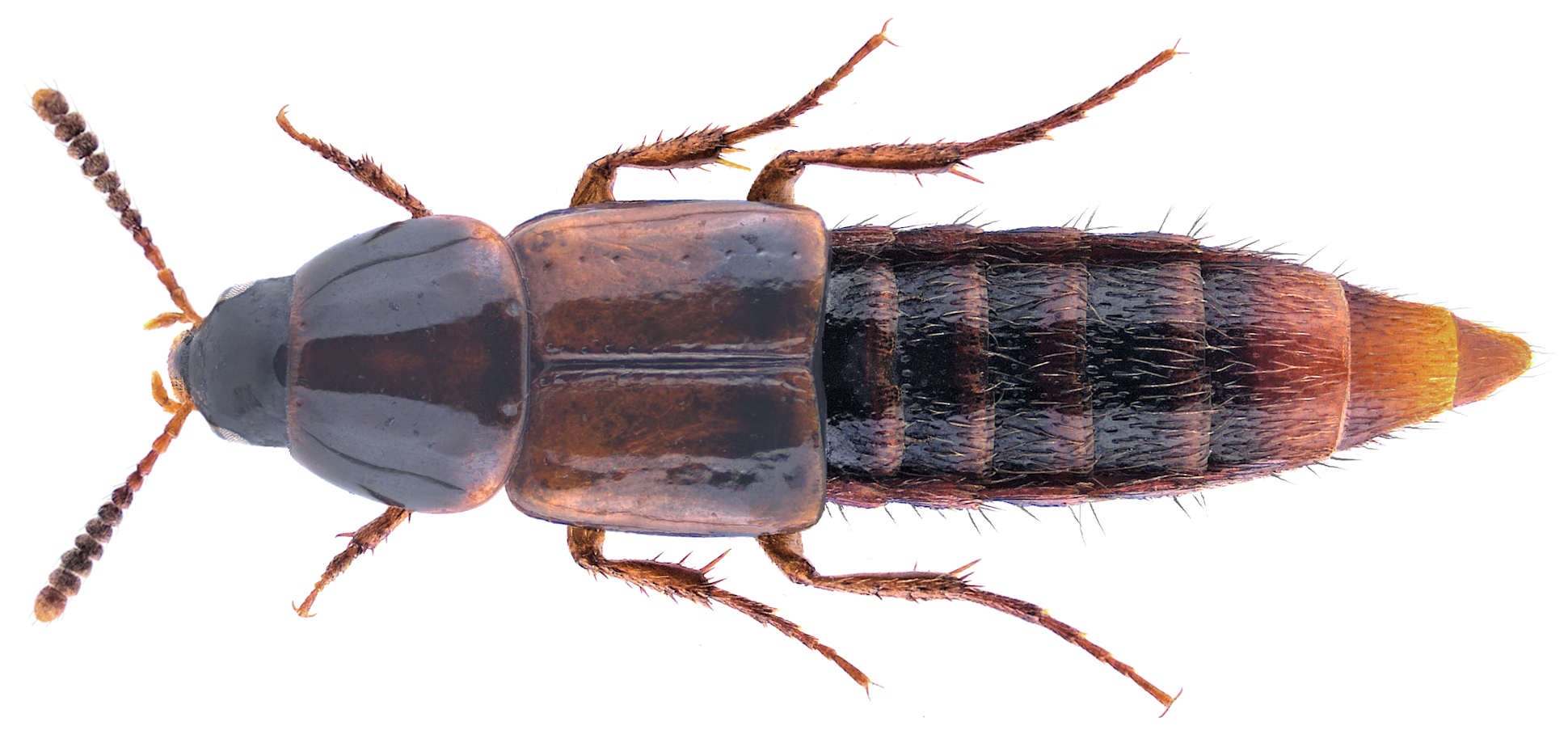
- Carphacis striatus

Scientific classification
- Kingdom: Animalia
- Phylum: Arthropoda
- Clade: Pancrustacea
- Class: Insecta
- Order: Coleoptera
- Suborder: Polyphaga
- Infraorder: Staphyliniformia
- Family: Staphylinidae
- Subfamily: Mycetoporinae
- Genus: Carphacis; Gozis, 1886

= Carphacis =

Genus of beetles

Chaphacis is a genus of rove beetles in the subfamily Mycetoporinae. It was first described in 1886, by Gozis. It contains 16 accepted species.

== Species ==
- Carphacis cooteri
- Carphacis crassicornis
- Carphacis dimidatus
- Carphacis effrenatus
- Carphacis flavomarinatus
- Carphacis gigas
- Carphacis hamatus
- Carphacis jarrigei
- Carphacis kawanabei
- Carphacis nepigonesis
- Carphacis nikkoensis
- Carphacis paramerus
- Carphacis rufipennis
- Carphacis striatus
- Carphacis yunnanus
- Carphacis zerchei
