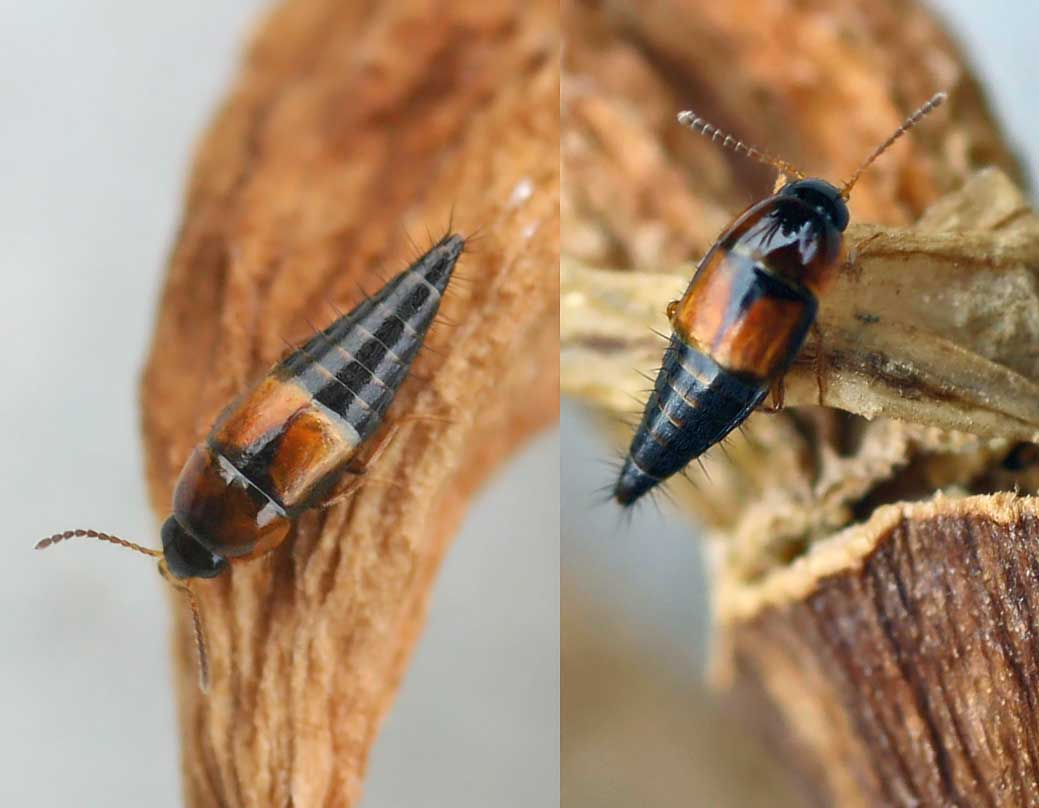

Scientific classification
- Kingdom: Animalia
- Phylum: Arthropoda
- Clade: Pancrustacea
- Class: Insecta
- Order: Coleoptera
- Suborder: Polyphaga
- Infraorder: Staphyliniformia
- Family: Staphylinidae
- Subfamily: Tachyporinae; MacLeay, 1825

Tribes
- Mycetoporini; Tachyporini; Vatesini

= Tachyporinae =

Subfamily of beetles

Tachyporinae is a subfamily of rove beetle. Their common name is crab-like rove beetles. They are generally small, roughly 2.4 to 5 millimeters.

There are around 60 species in twelve genera of crab-like rove beetles. All species are fusiform.

== Gallery ==
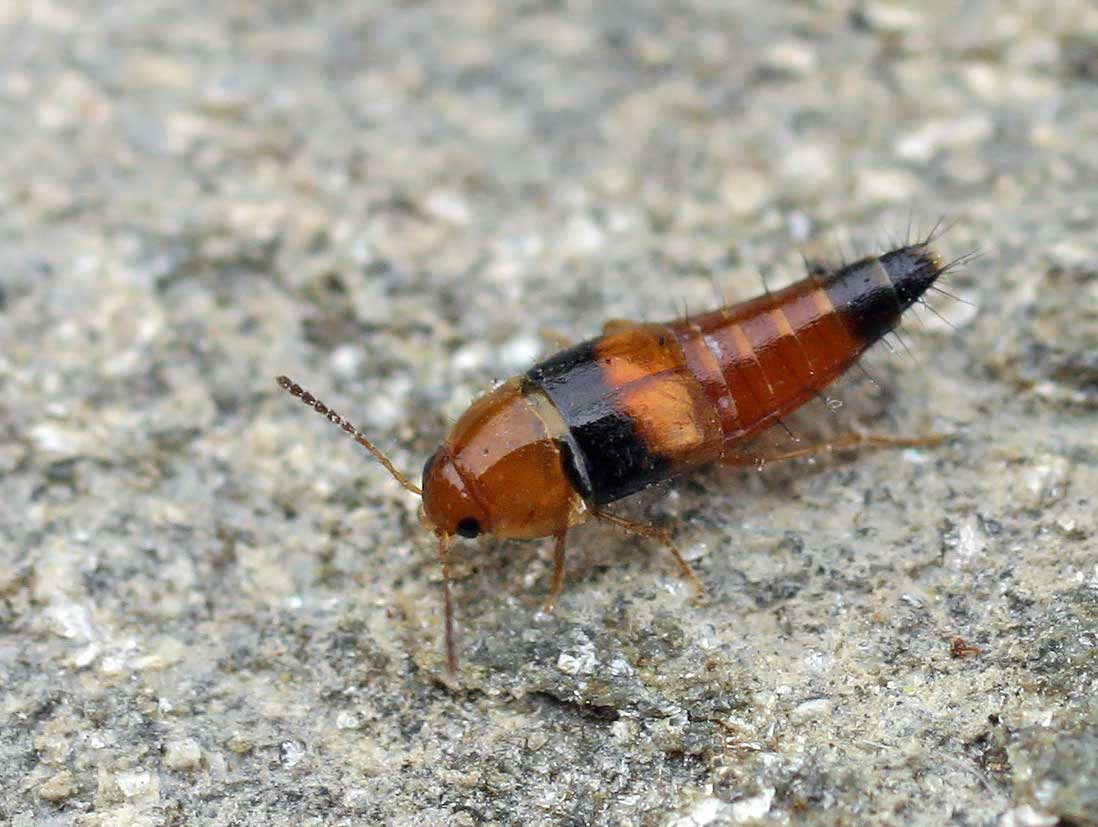
Tachyporus obtusus on ground
