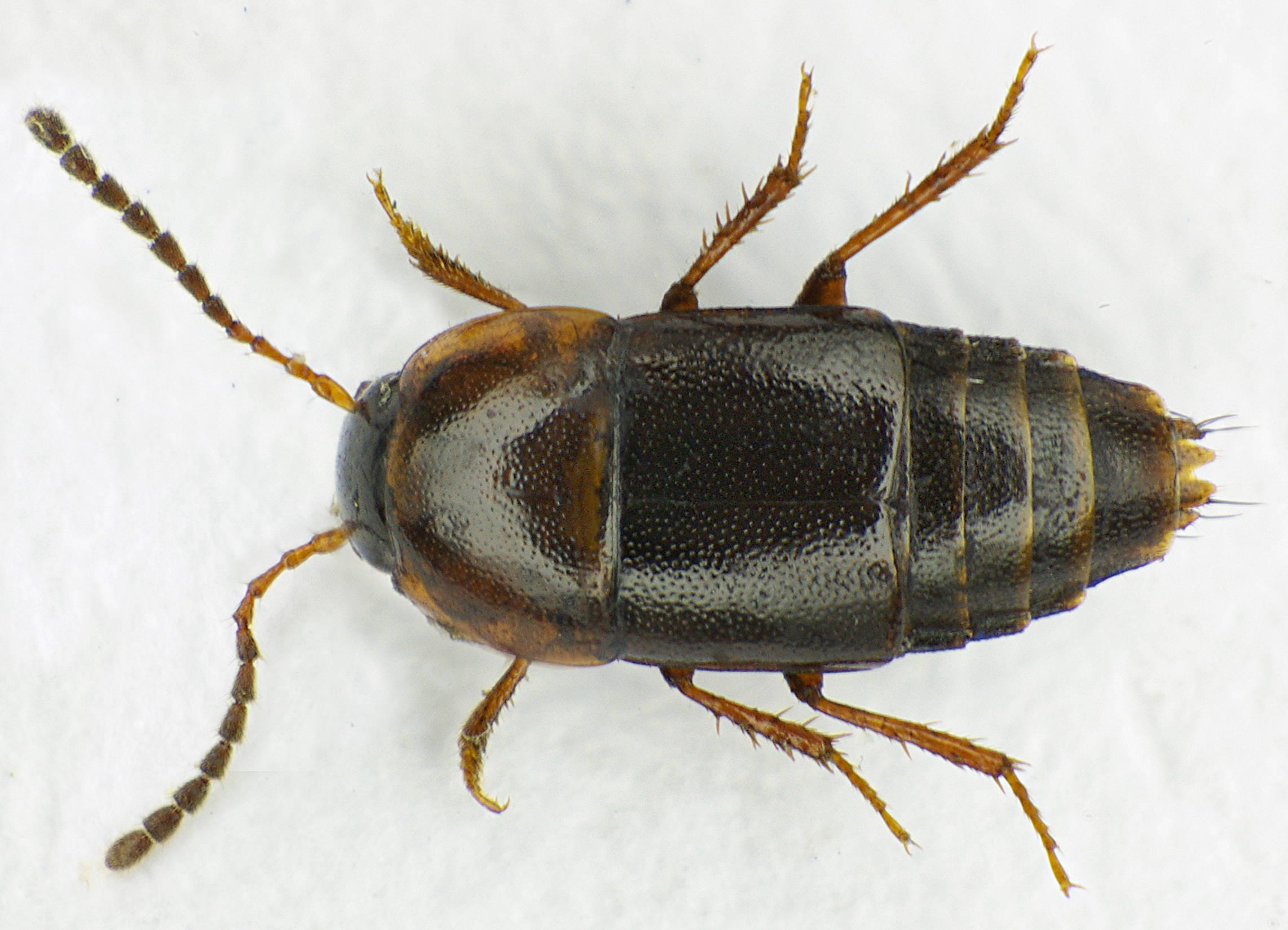
- Tachinus corticinus

Scientific classification
- Kingdom: Animalia
- Phylum: Arthropoda
- Class: Insecta
- Order: Coleoptera
- Suborder: Polyphaga
- Infraorder: Staphyliniformia
- Family: Staphylinidae
- Tribe: Tachyporini
- Genus: Tachinus; Gravenhorst, 1802

= Tachinus =

Genus of beetles

Tachinus is a genus of crab-like rove beetles in the family Staphylinidae. There are at least 120 described species in Tachinus.

== See also ==
- List of Tachinus species
