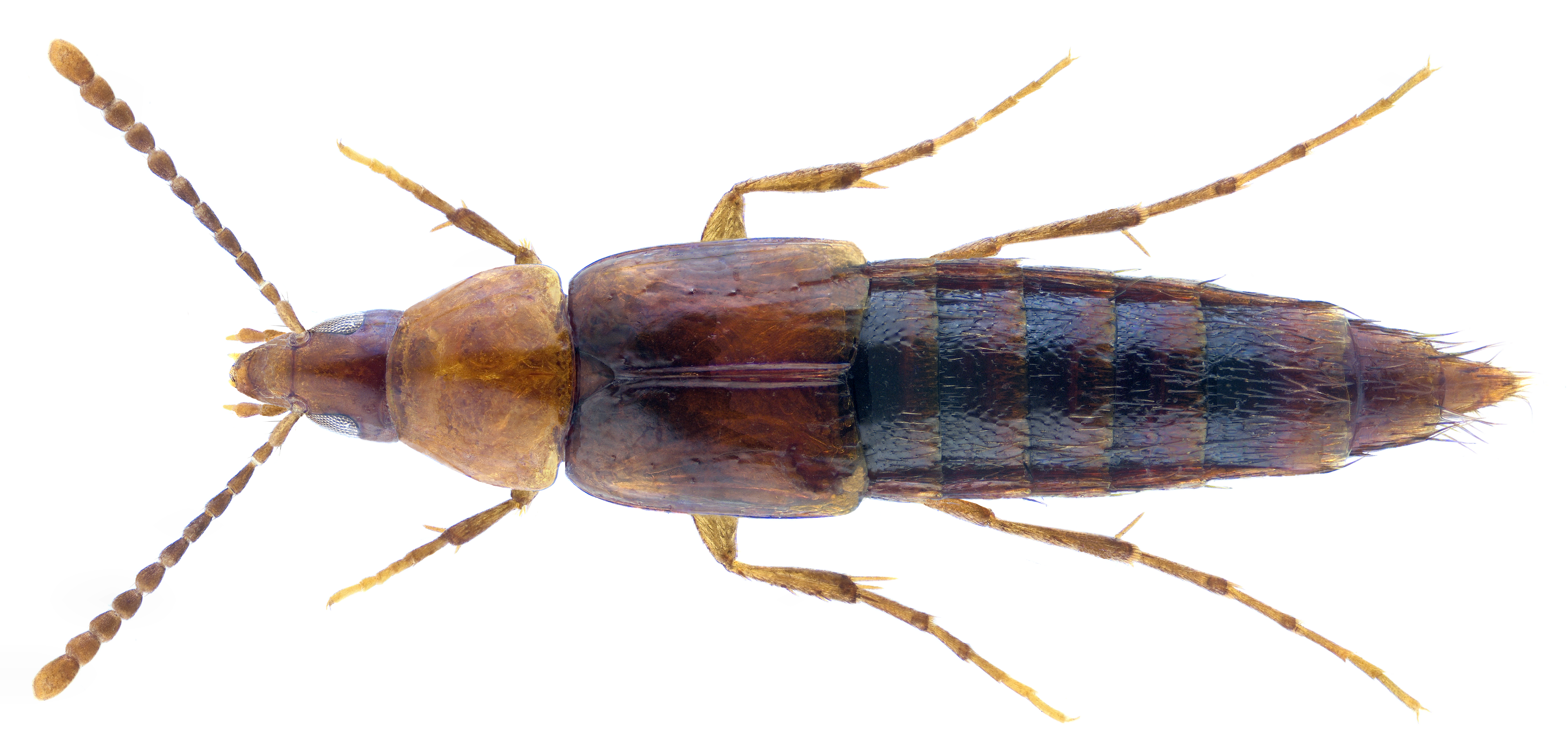
- Ischnosoma splendidum

Scientific classification
- Kingdom: Animalia
- Phylum: Arthropoda
- Clade: Pancrustacea
- Class: Insecta
- Order: Coleoptera
- Suborder: Polyphaga
- Infraorder: Staphyliniformia
- Family: Staphylinidae
- Subfamily: Mycetoporinae
- Genus: Ischnosoma; Stephens, 1829

= Ischnosoma =

Genus of beetles

Ischnosoma is a genus of beetles belonging to the family Staphylinidae.

The species of this genus are found in Eurasia, America, Australia.

Species:

- Ischnosoma abdenago Kocian, 2003
- Ischnosoma abessinum (Bernhauer, 1915)
