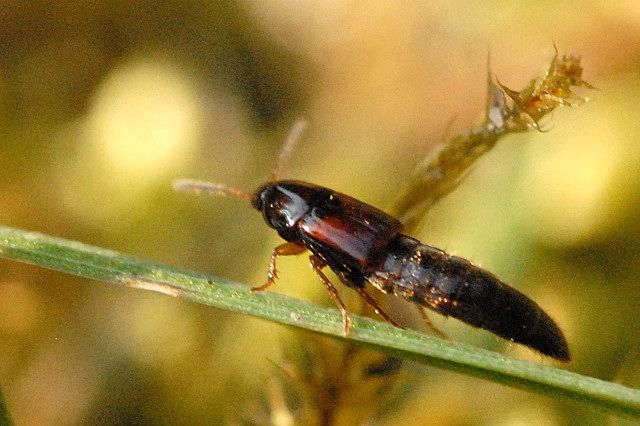

Scientific classification
- Kingdom: Animalia
- Phylum: Arthropoda
- Clade: Pancrustacea
- Class: Insecta
- Order: Coleoptera
- Suborder: Polyphaga
- Infraorder: Staphyliniformia
- Family: Staphylinidae
- Subfamily: Mycetoporinae
- Genus: Mycetoporus; Mannerheim, 1830

= Mycetoporus =

Genus of beetles

Mycetoporus is a genius of crab-like rove beetles in the family Staphylinidae. There are at least 70 described species in Mycetoporus.

== Species ==
These 78 species belong to the genus Mycetoporus:

- Mycetoporus adumbratus Wollaston, 1865^{g}
- Mycetoporus aequalis Thomson, 1868^{g}
- Mycetoporus altaicus Luze, 1901^{g}
- Mycetoporus ambiguus Luze, 1901^{g}
- Mycetoporus americanus Erichson, 1839^{g}
- Mycetoporus angularis Mulsant & Rey, 1854^{g}
- Mycetoporus baudueri Mulsant & Rey, 1875^{g}
- Mycetoporus bimaculatus Lacordaire, 1835^{g}
- Mycetoporus bipunctatus Campbell, 1991^{g}
- Mycetoporus bolitoboides Bernhauer^{g}
- Mycetoporus boreellus Sahlberg, J., 1876^{c g}
- Mycetoporus bosnicus Luze, 1901^{g}
- Mycetoporus bruckii (Pandellé, 1869)^{g}
- Mycetoporus christinae Palm, 1975^{g}
- Mycetoporus clavicornis (Stephens, 1832)^{g}
- Mycetoporus confinis Rey, 1883^{g}
- Mycetoporus consors LeConte, 1863^{g b}
- Mycetoporus corpulentus Luze, 1901^{g}
- Mycetoporus dalmatinus Luze, 1901^{g}
- Mycetoporus debilis Mäklin, 1847^{g}
- Mycetoporus despectus Strand, 1969^{g}
- Mycetoporus discoidalis Sharp^{g}
- Mycetoporus discoideus Wollaston, 1865^{g}
- Mycetoporus dispersus Schülke & Kocian, 2000^{g}
- Mycetoporus endogeus Coiffait, 1980^{g}
- Mycetoporus eppelsheimianus Fagel, 1968^{g}
- Mycetoporus erichsonanus Fagel, 1965^{g}
- Mycetoporus feloi Schulke, 2000^{g}
- Mycetoporus forticornis Fauvel, 1875^{g}
- Mycetoporus glaber (Sperk, 1835)^{g}
- Mycetoporus gracilis Luze, 1901^{g}
- Mycetoporus horni Bernhauer & Schubert, 1916^{g}
- Mycetoporus ignidorsus Eppelsheim, 1880^{g}
- Mycetoporus imperialis Bernhauer, 1902^{g}
- Mycetoporus inaris Luze, 1901^{g}
- Mycetoporus inquisitus Casey, 1885^{g}
- Mycetoporus insulanus Luze, 1901^{g}
- Mycetoporus johnsoni Wollaston, 1860^{g}
- Mycetoporus jonicus Scheerpeltz, 1958^{g}
- Mycetoporus kahleni Schulke, 1996^{g}
- Mycetoporus lapponicus Thomson, 1861^{g}
- Mycetoporus lepidus (Gravenhorst, 1806)^{g}
- Mycetoporus linderi Scheerpeltz, 1970^{g}
- Mycetoporus longulus Mannerheim, 1830^{g}
- Mycetoporus lucidulus LeConte, 1863^{g}
- Mycetoporus macrocephalus Bernhauer, 1917^{g}
- Mycetoporus maerkeli Kraatz, 1857^{g}
- Mycetoporus mediterraneus Bernhauer, 1917^{g}
- Mycetoporus montanus Luze, 1901^{c g}
- Mycetoporus monticola Fowler, 1888^{g}
- Mycetoporus mulsanti Ganglbauer, 1895^{g}
- Mycetoporus neotomae Fall, 1910^{g b}
- Mycetoporus nidicola Campbell, 1991^{g}
- Mycetoporus niger Fairmaire & Laboulbène, 1856^{g}
- Mycetoporus nigrans Méklin, 1853^{g}
- Mycetoporus nigricollis Stephens, 1835^{g}
- Mycetoporus oreophilus Bernhauer, 1900^{g}
- Mycetoporus pachyraphis Pandellé, 1869^{c g}
- Mycetoporus pacificus Campbell, 1991^{g}
- Mycetoporus piceolus Rey, 1882^{g}
- Mycetoporus pollinensis Scheerpeltz, 1956^{g}
- Mycetoporus portosanctanus Palm, 1980^{g}
- Mycetoporus punctipennis W.Scriba, 1868^{g}
- Mycetoporus quadrillum Fauvel, 1871^{g}
- Mycetoporus reichei (Pandellé, 1869)^{g}
- Mycetoporus revelierei Rey, 1883^{g}
- Mycetoporus rondaensis Fagel, 1958^{g}
- Mycetoporus rufescens (Stephens, 1832)^{g}
- Mycetoporus ruffoi Scheerpeltz, 1961^{g}
- Mycetoporus rufohumeralis Campbell, 1991^{g}
- Mycetoporus rugosus Hatch, 1957^{g}
- Mycetoporus smetanai Campbell, 1991^{g}
- Mycetoporus solidicornis Wollaston, 1864^{g}
- Mycetoporus tenuis Mulsant & Rey, 1853^{g}
- Mycetoporus triangulatus Campbell, 1991^{g}
- Mycetoporus wingelmuelleri Luze, 1901^{g}
- Mycetoporus wollastoni Fauvel, 1897^{g}
- Mycetoporus zeithammeri Bernhauer, 1902^{g}

Data sources: i = ITIS, c = Catalogue of Life, g = GBIF, b = Bugguide.net
