= Edmund Reitter =

Austrian entomologist (1845–1920)

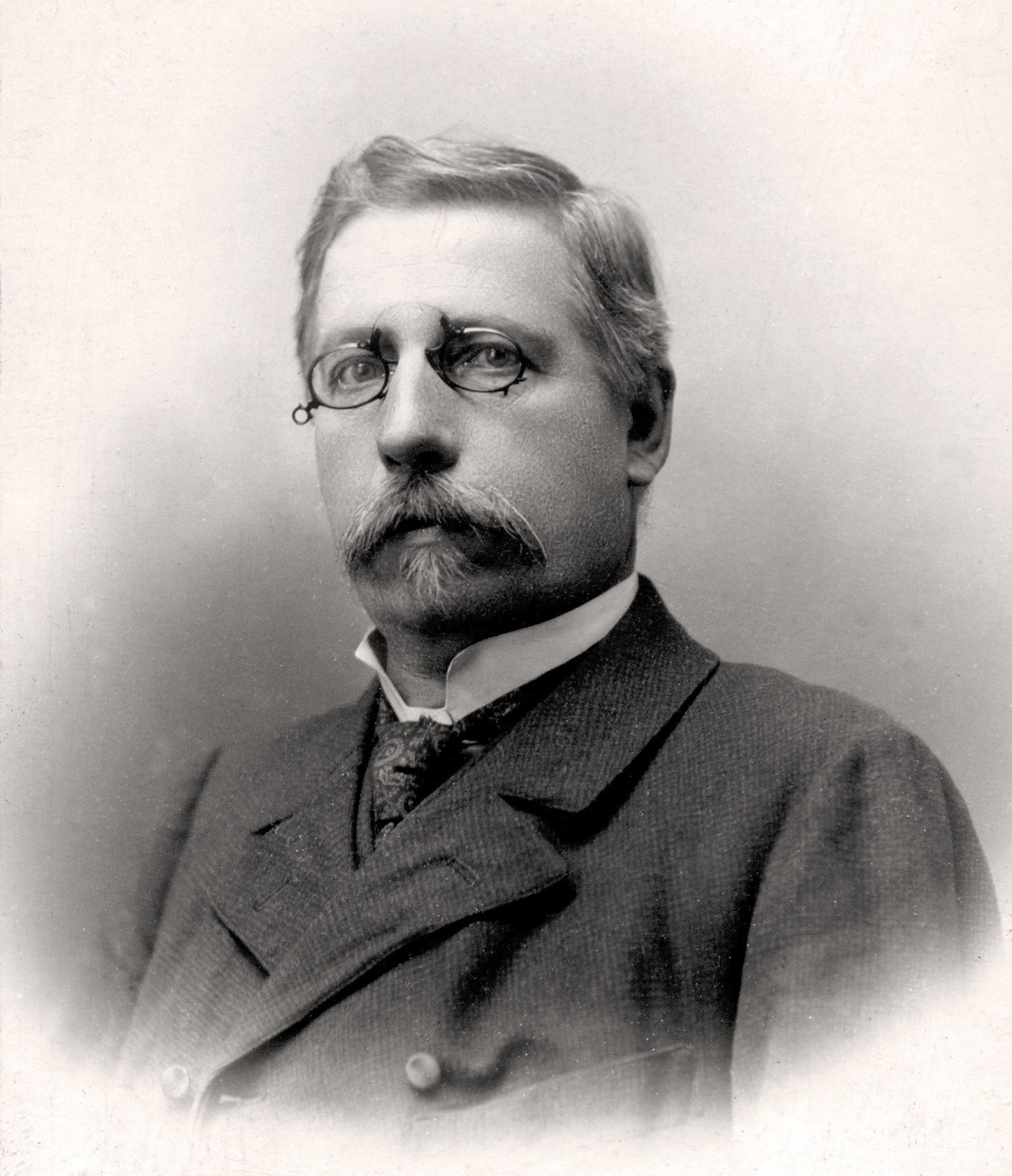
- Born: 22 October 1845; Mohelnice, Moravia
- Died: 15 March 1920 (aged 74); Paskov, Czechoslovakia
- Scientific career
- Fields: Entomology

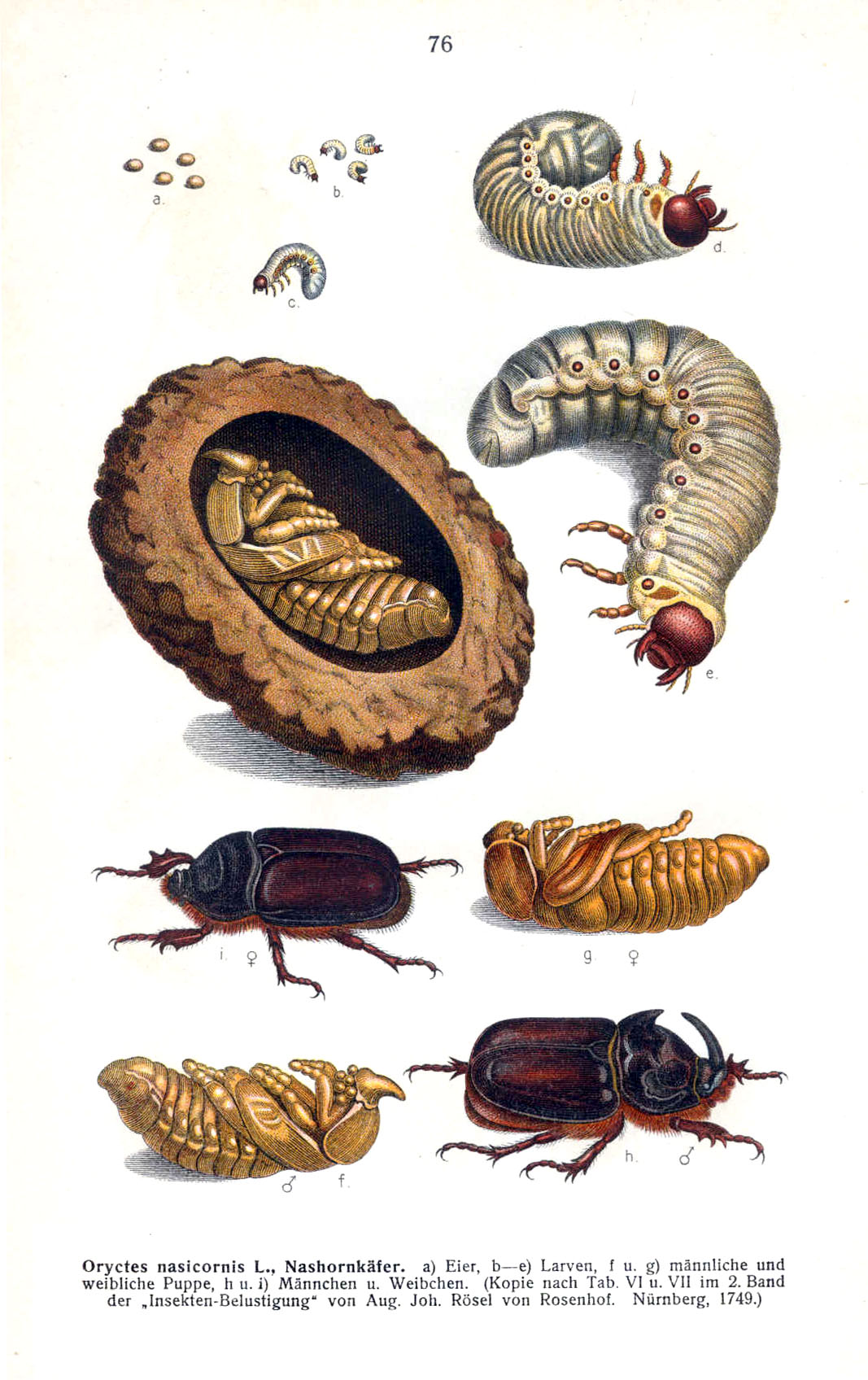
Life Cycle of Rhinoceros Scarab; from Edmund Reitter's Fauna Germanica. Die Käfer des Deutschen Reiches. Band II (1909)

Edmund Reitter (22 October 1845 – 15 March 1920) was an Austrian entomologist, writer and a collector.

== Biography ==
Edmund Reitter was best known as an expert on the beetles of the Palaearctic. He was an imperial advisor and editor of the Wiener Entomologischen Zeitung, (Vienna Entomological Gazette). In addition he was a member and honorary member of Deutsche Gesellschaft für allgemeine und angewandte Entomologie in Berlin, the Vereins für schlesische Insektenkunde in Breslau, the Museum Francisco-Carolinum in Linz, the Vereins für Naturkunde (Association for Natural History) in Austria, the Société entomologique de Russie in Saint Petersburg, the Société royale entomologique d'Égypte and the Nederlandse Entomologische Vereniging in Rotterdam.

He was also known as an insect dealer. In 1909, Reitter identified the Bryophacis beetle.

As a corresponding member he worked with the Naturwissenschaftlichen Verein in Troppau, the Socíetas pro Fauna et Flora fennica in Helsinki and the Real Sociedad Española de Historia Natural in Madrid.

His beetle collection is preserved in the Natural History Museum in Budapest. It contains more than 30,000 species including 5,000 type specimens.

== Works ==
- Die Käfer des Deutschen Reiches 5 Bände, Stuttgart K. G. Lutz 1908 - 1917 (digital: Edmund Reitter: Fauna Germanica - Die Käfer des Deutschen Reiches, Digitale Bibliothek Band 134, Directmnedia Publishing GmbH, Berlin 2006. ISBN 3-89853-534-7)

== See also ==
- Category:Taxa named by Edmund Reitter

== Gallery ==
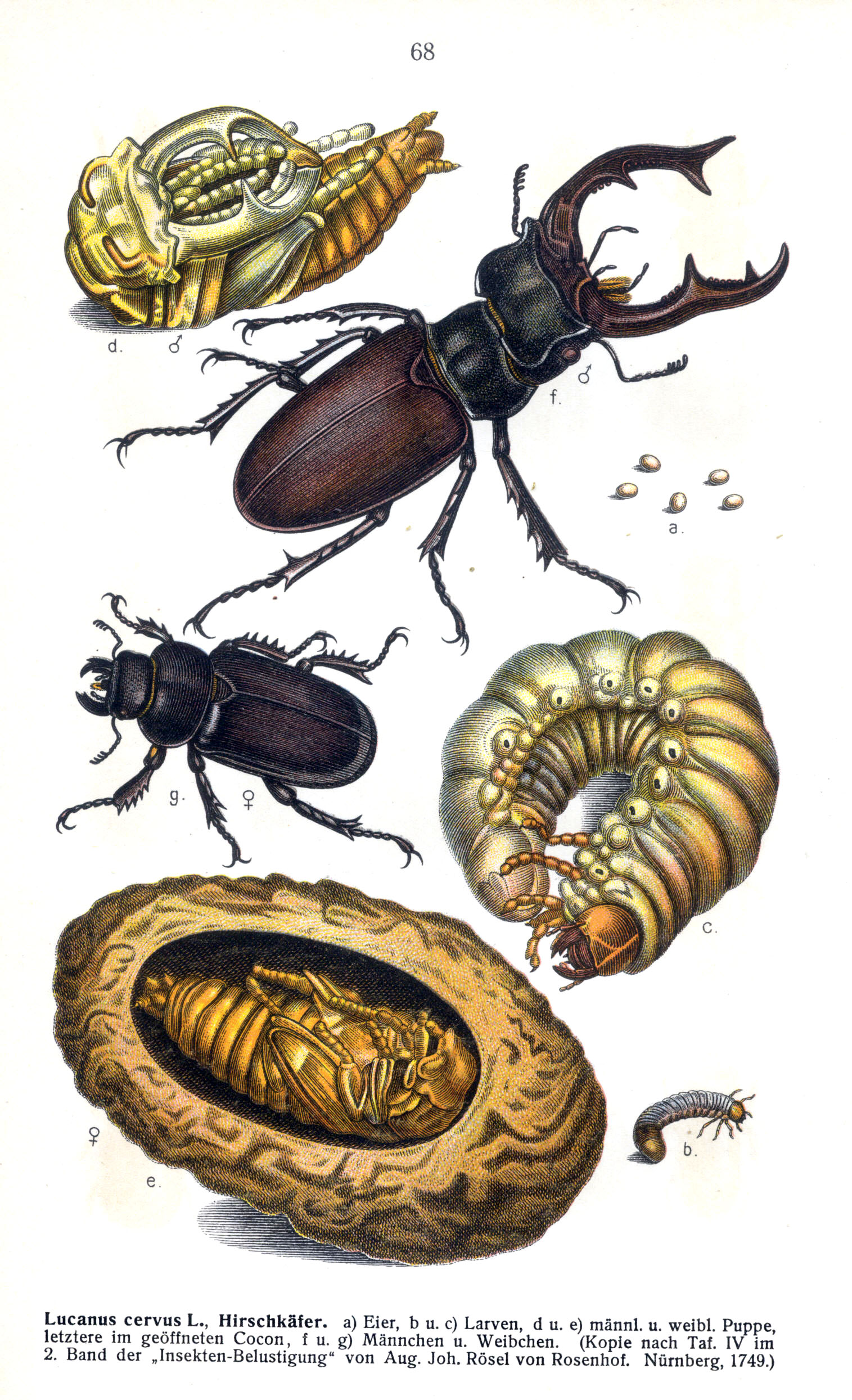
Lucanidae. Plate from Die Käfer

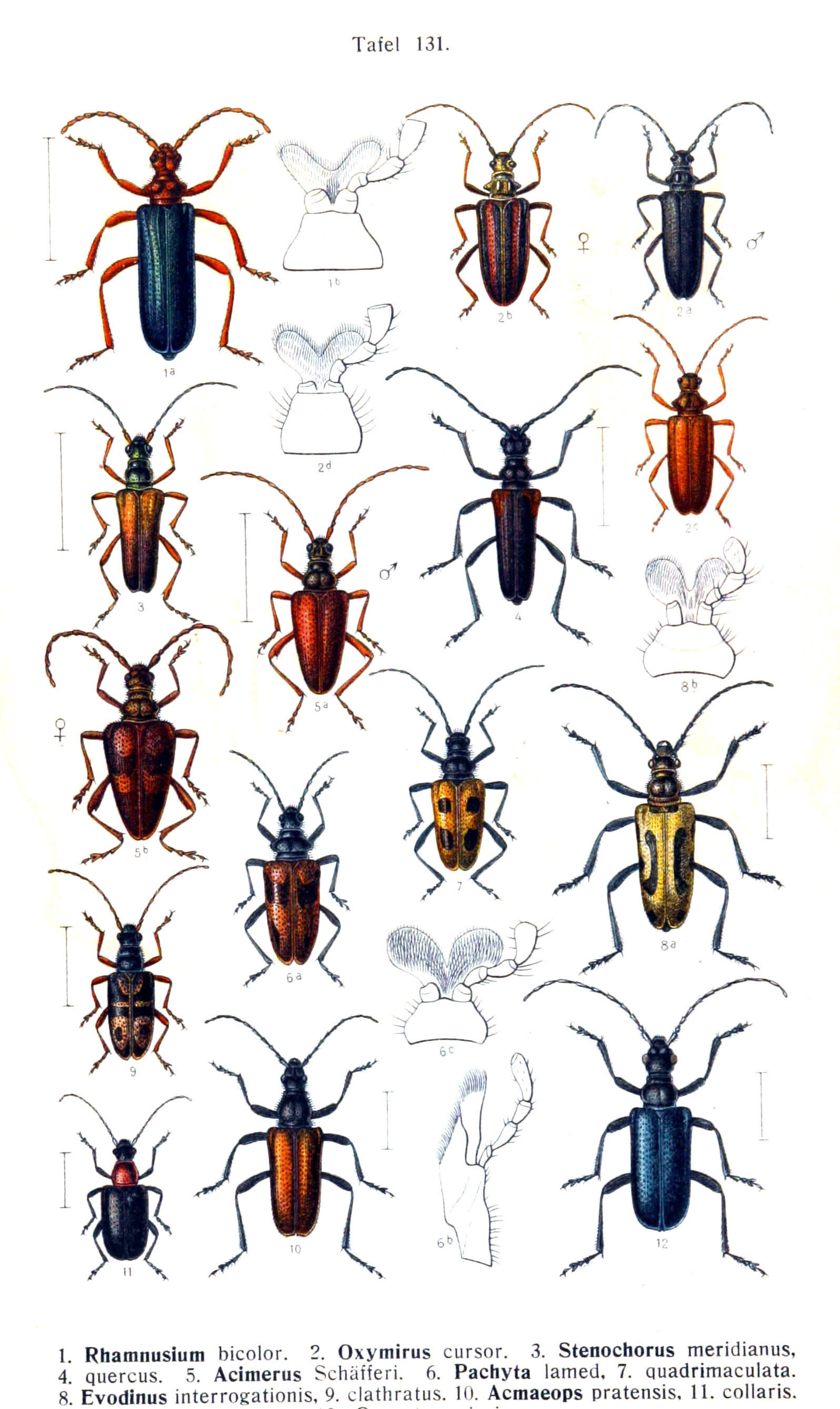
Cerambycidae. Plate from Die Käfer

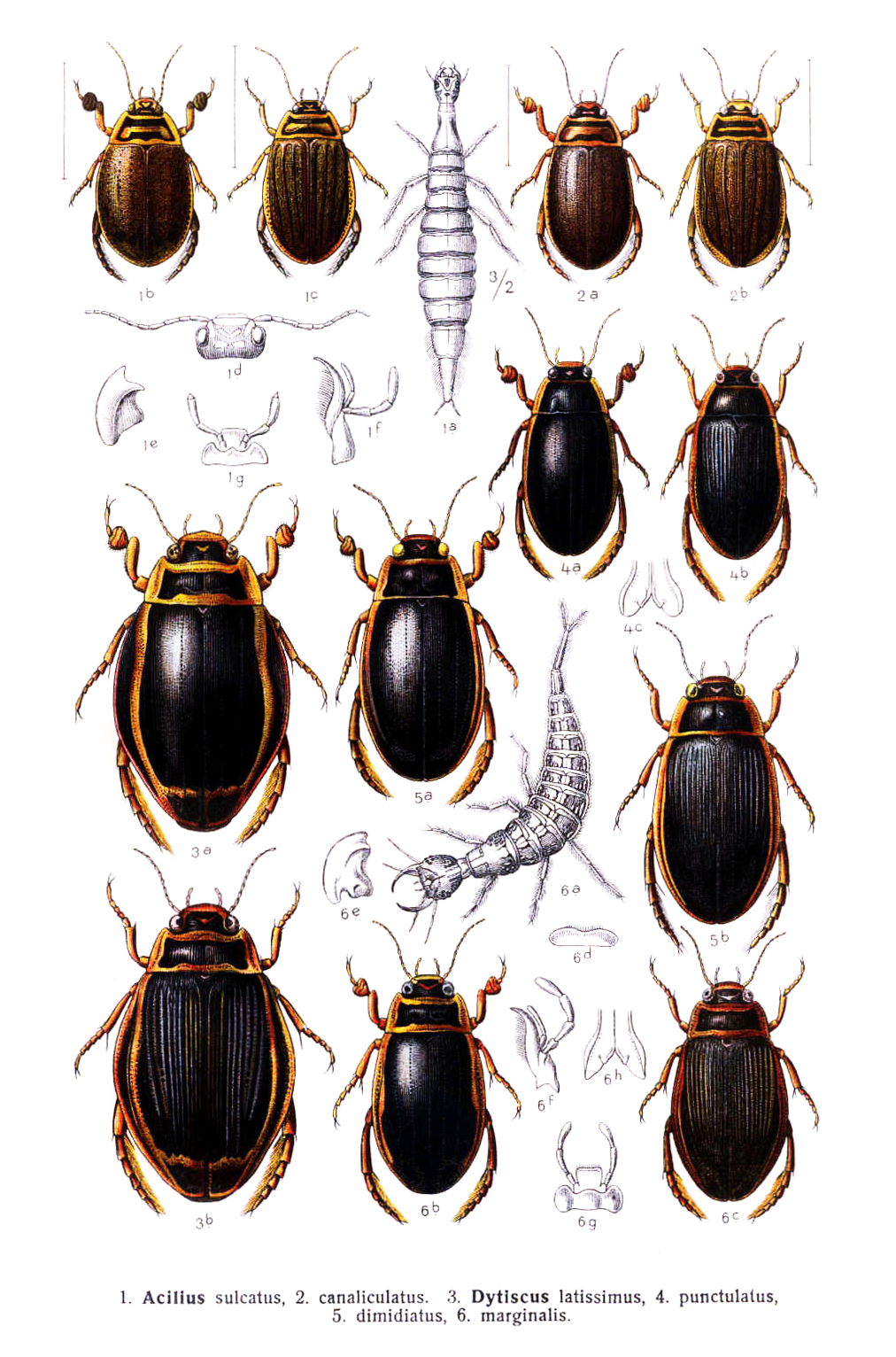
Dytiscidae. Plate from Die Käfer

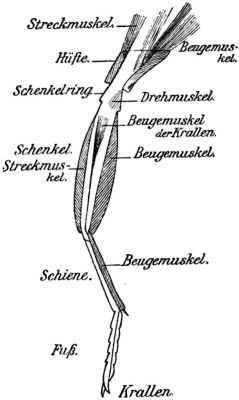
Leg of a beetle. Plate from Die Käfer

=== Sources ===
- Guido Nonveiller (2001). Pioneers of the Research on the Insects of Dalmatia. Croatian Natural History Museum (Zagreb) : 390 pp.
