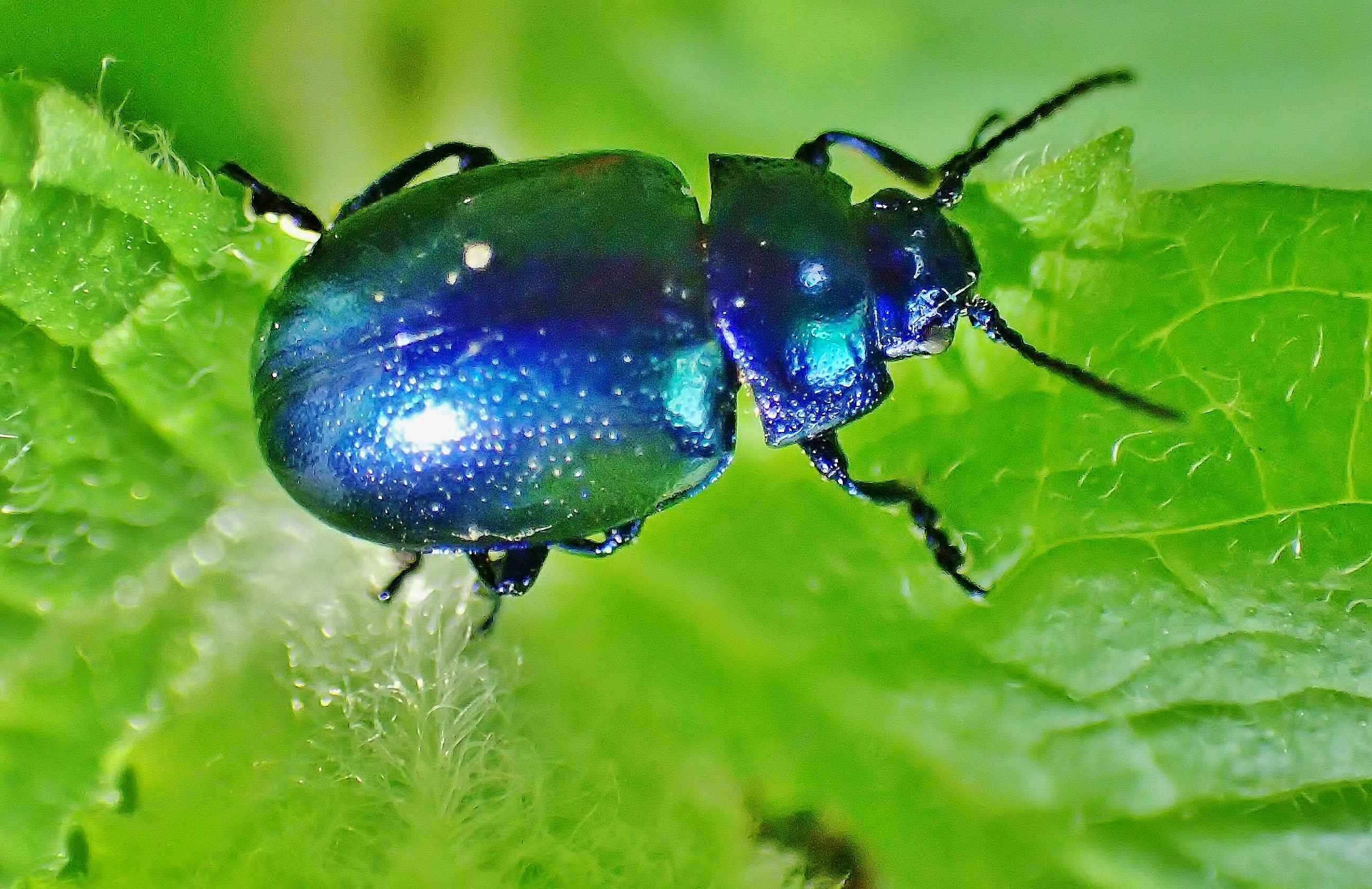

Scientific classification
- Kingdom: Animalia
- Phylum: Arthropoda
- Clade: Pancrustacea
- Class: Insecta
- Order: Coleoptera
- Suborder: Polyphaga
- Infraorder: Cucujiformia
- Family: Chrysomelidae
- Genus: Chrysolina
- Subgenus: Synerga
- Species: C. coerulans

Binomial name
- Chrysolina coerulans (Scriba, 1791)

Synonyms
- Chrysomela coerulans L.G.Scriba, 1791

= Chrysolina coerulans =

Species of beetle

Chrysolina coerulans, also known as the blue mint beetle or blue mint leaf beetle, is a species of beetle in the family Chrysomelidae. It is a member of the subgenus Synerga of the genus Chrysolina. It is native to a wide range of countries between Central and Eastern Europe and lives alongside rivers and in meadows, it feeds on various plant members of the mint family.

It was first spotted in the UK in 2011, when it was first reported to the Royal Horticultural Society's entomology department in July. In 2012, it was found breeding in Kent, Cambridgeshire and Lincolnshire. It has further spread throughout the UK.

== Description ==
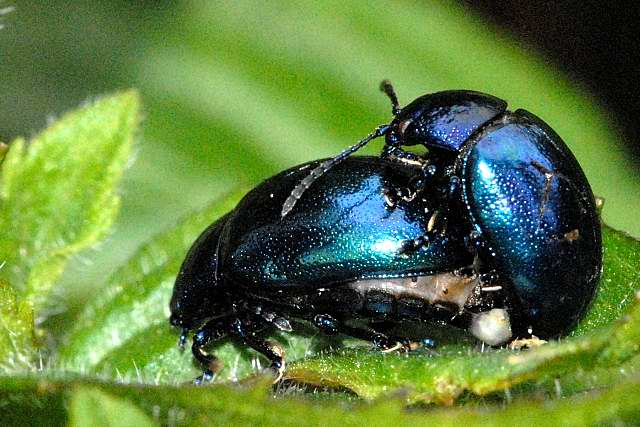
Chrysolina coerulans

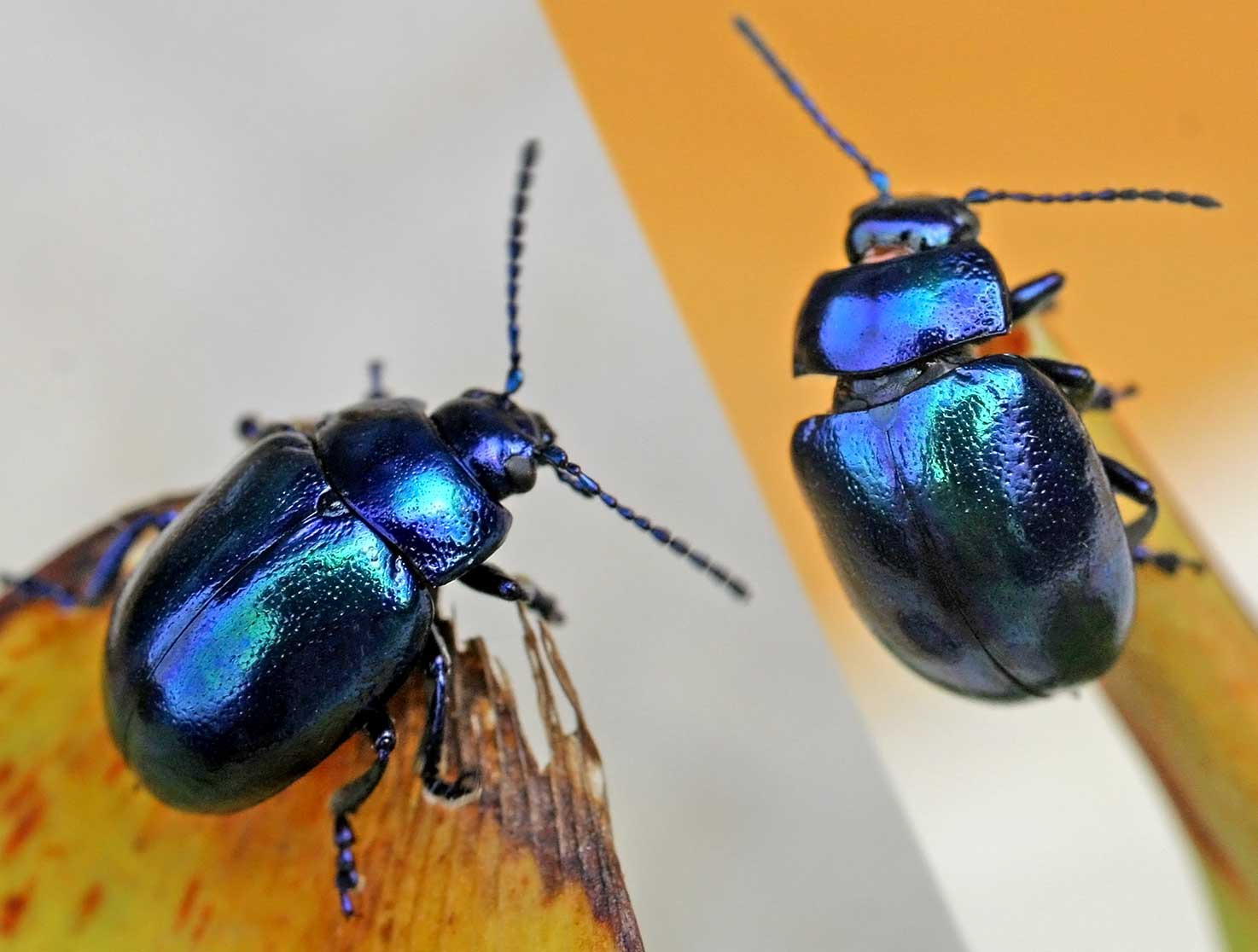
Chrysolina coerulans

The larvae of Chrysolina coerulans are soft-bodied, rounded in shape and black in colour.

Th adult beetles are 6–10 mm (0.24–0.39 in) long, with black legs and antennae. It has a smooth head, without longitudinal groove, and parallel-sided thorax. The pronotal disk (which is found at the top of the first thoracic segment) of C. coerulans has fine punctures. It has a smooth elytra (hardened forewing), which is distinctly metallic blue, or iridescent blue.

These beetles should not be confused with the 'green mint beetle' (or Chrysolina herbacea), as it is greener in appearance (emerald green,) and slightly larger in size, as C. herbacea measures 7–11 mm in length. C. herbacea and Chrysolina graminis (tansy beetle) both have a mixture of fine and coarse punctures on the pronotal disk.

Similar to other species of Chrysolina beetles, C. coerulans has cardiac glycosides (including xylose) in its defensive glands.

== Taxonomy ==
It is commonly known as the blue mint beetle, or blue mint leaf beetle.

It was originally published and described by German theologian and entomologist, Ludwig Gottlieb Scriba in 1791 in Journal für die Liebhaber der Entomologie, Volume 3 on page 286.

Its species name coerulans is a form of the Latin noun caeruleus meaning 'turning blue', or coeruleus meaning 'blue'. Occasionally, it is misspelt as Chrysolina caerulans, (with an 'a' in the second name).

== Distribution ==
Its distribution spans mid and eastern Europe, including Cyprus, Hungary, France, Italy, Macedonia, Turkey. Then in 2009; Latvia, and then in 2011; Austria, Belarus, Bosnia and Herzegovina, Bulgaria, Croatia, Czech Republic, Estonia, Germany, Ireland, Liechtenstein, Poland, Romania, Slovakia, Slovenia, Switzerland, the Netherlands, and Ukraine. The 2009 source also mentions the range extending to Central Asia; the Caucasus, Iran, Iraq, Afghanistan, southern Urals, western China, northern and eastern India.

== Habitat ==
It is found in damp meadows and along riversides, in lowlands and mountains, up to 1,650 m (5,410 ft) above sea level.

== Biology ==
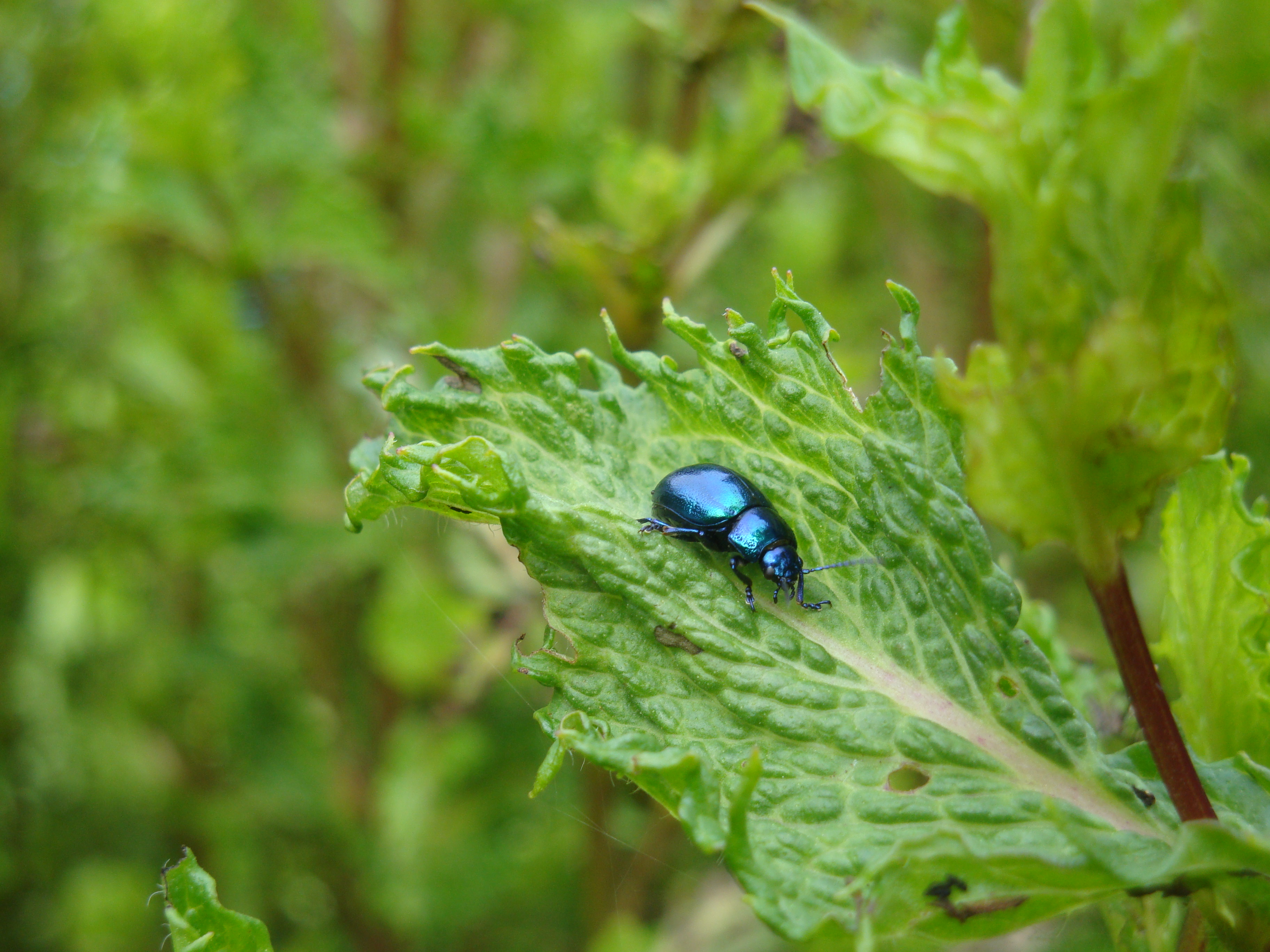
Chrysolina coerulans

Adults can be found from May to September. Their life span is one year, and they are diurnal (meaning active during the day), They feed on various plant species of Mentha and Tanacetum, including within a garden setting; garden mint, Moroccan mint, spearmint and Corsican mint types, as well as the wild horse mint. Both larvae and adults feed on mint leaves in spring and summer.

== Blue mint beetle in the UK ==
In Kent, it was detected breeding in the UK for the first time in July 2011, it had come from mainland Europe. It was then first reported to the Royal Horticultural Society's entomology department.

The RHS then started asking gardeners to check mint plants for tell-tale holes, then report them back to them. There had been a single confirmed sighting, the RHS was keen to find out if it was an isolated outbreak.

RHS plant health principal scientist Andrew Halstead said as the bug was established on mainland Europe, "The detection of breeding adults in the UK could mean problems for gardeners who grow this herb," he said. "It is important that we find out if there are other breeding adults in the UK."

Main symptoms UK gardeners were asked to look for irregular holes in foliage and blue beetles on the leaves.

In 2012, it was recorded as being found in several locations in Cambridgeshire and Lincolnshire.

It was later recorded as being found in Hampshire, parts of London and Edinburgh. It was expected to spread further throughout the UK, as the beetle has a widespread occurrence on the mainland of Europe.

There are a few other beetles that are similar in form to the blue mint beetle, but they feed on different plants. A metallic blue beetle located near an alder tree will most likely be an alder leaf beetle (Agelastica alni), as opposed to a blue mint beetle found on mint plants.

== Treatment ==
=== Biological treatment ===
Mint plants are quite hardy and are able to tolerate some damage to the leaves. However, hand removal of beetles can be done if required.

=== Chemical treatment ===
As mint plants are normally grown to be used for culinary purposes, it is recommended that chemical treatments should not be used. Also pesticides should be avoided if plants are located near water bodies.

If needed, there is a wide range of organic pesticides on the market. These can be applied to the larvae over a course of several applications. However, as chemicals are non-selective, they can affect everything nearby.

== Other sources ==
- Cambridge Scientific Abstracts, (2000). Entomology Abstracts, Volume 31, Issues 7–9
- Salisbury, A. & Halstead, A.J. (2012). Blue mint beetle Chrysolina coerulans (Scriba) (Chrysomelidae) breeding in Cambridgeshire. The Coleopterist 21(3): 145.
- Sage, B. (2009). Chrysolina coerulans (Scriba) (Chrysomelidae) in Norfolk: the second British record. The Coleopterist 18(1): 6.
- Sage, B. (2009). The second occurrence of Chrysolina coerulans (Scriba) (Chrysomelidae) in Norfolk. The Coleopterist 18(2): 138.
- Recently found Chrysolina coerulans in village of Dearham, Cumbria in May 2022. Photographed.
