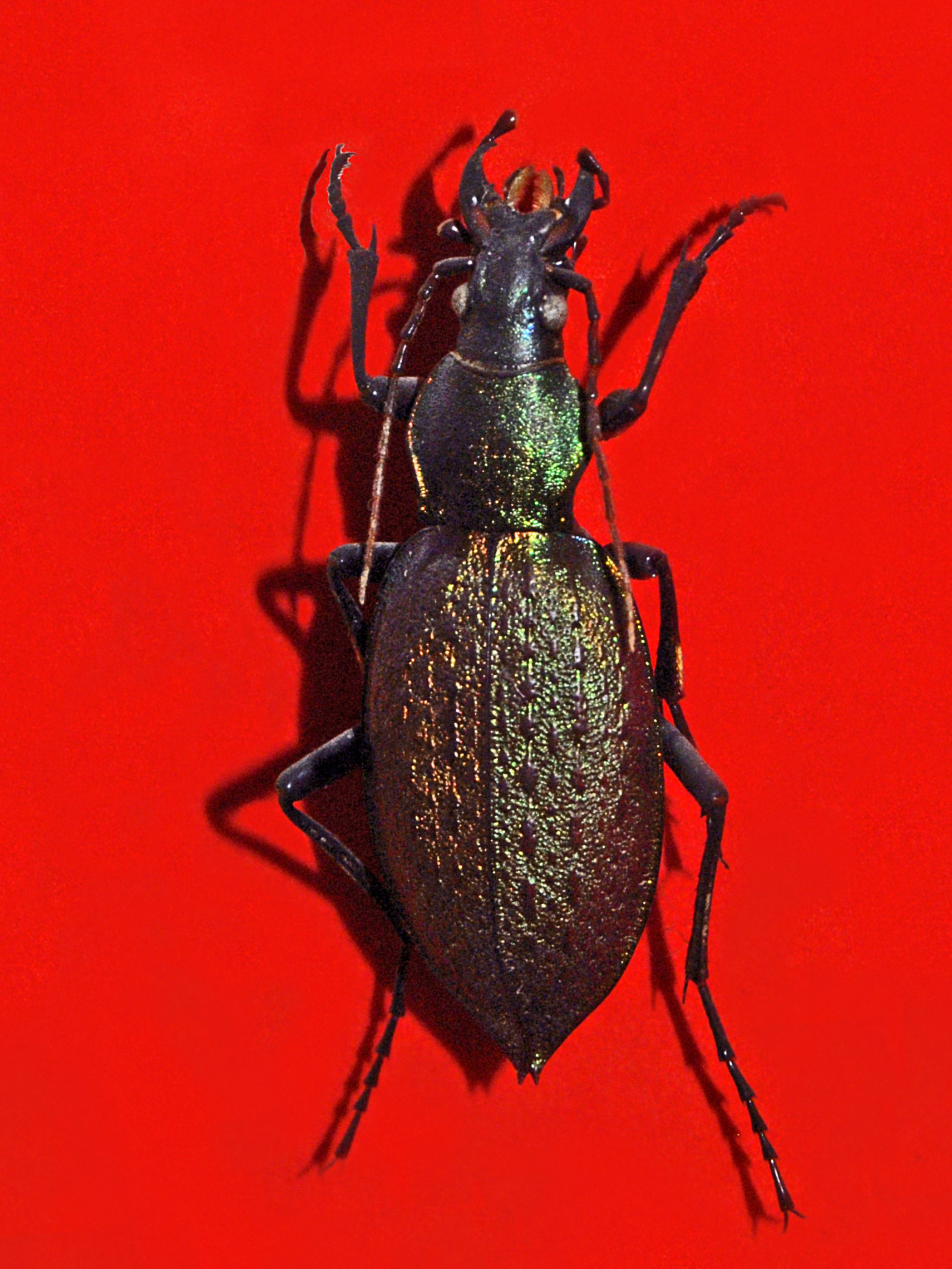
- Museum specimen, listed as Carabus smaragdinus branickii

Scientific classification
- Kingdom: Animalia
- Phylum: Arthropoda
- Clade: Pancrustacea
- Class: Insecta
- Order: Coleoptera
- Suborder: Adephaga
- Family: Carabidae
- Subfamily: Carabinae
- Tribe: Carabini
- Genus: Carabus
- Species: C. monilifer

Binomial name
- Carabus monilifer Tatum, 1847

Synonyms
- Carabus smaragdinus Fischer von Waldheim, 1823 nec Duftschmid, 1812 (Junior primary homonym)

= Carabus monilifer =

Species of beetle

Carabus monilifer is a species of ground beetle in the family Carabidae. It is found in China, North and South Korea, and Russia.

== Description ==
Carabus monilifer can reach a length of about 30–45 millimetres (1.2–1.8 in). The body is slender and the surface is metallic (varying from green or reddish coppery), depending on subspecies. The elytra are broad, robust and longitudinally covered with rows of small raised nodules. Adults can be found from May through September. They are predators of other invertebrates, particularly insects, but may eat others such as earthworms.

== Distribution ==
This species can be found in southern Russian Far East, North and South Korea, and in China; from Inner Mongolia to Jilin and Henan to the east and Shanxi to the west.

== Subspecies ==
These subspecies belong to the species Carabus monilifer (after Löbl & Löbl, 2017):

- Carabus monilifer branickii Taczanowski, 1888 (China, North Korea, and South Korea)
- Carabus monilifer cyanelytron Deuve & Li in Deuve, 2003 (China)
- Carabus monilifer dachangensis Li & A.Mülller, 2009 (China)
- Carabus monilifer dolichognathus Deuve, 1995 (North Korea)
- Carabus monilifer euviridis (Ishikawa & Kim, 1983) (South Korea)
- Carabus monilifer furumiellus Deuve, 1994 (China)
- Carabus monilifer hoenggandoensis (Kwon & Lee, 1984) (South Korea)
- Carabus monilifer honanensis (G.Hauser, 1921) (China)
- Carabus monilifer hongdoensis (Kwon & Lee, 1984) (South Korea)
- Carabus monilifer lengxuemeiae Deuve & Li in Deuve, 2001 (China)
- Carabus monilifer liaodongensis (Li, 1992) (China)
- Carabus monilifer longipennis (Chaudoir, 1863) (China and Russia) (formerly Carabus smaragdinus)
- Carabus monilifer losevi Rapuzzi, 2016 (Russia)
- Carabus monilifer mandshuricus Semenov, 1898 (China, North Korea, and Russia)
- Carabus monilifer monilifer Tatum, 1847 (South Korea)
- Carabus monilifer neomaoershanicus Li; A.Müller & Zhang, 2008 (China)
- Carabus monilifer pinganensis (G.Hauser, 1920) (North Korea)
- Carabus monilifer shantungensis (Born, 1910) (China)
- Carabus monilifer sungkii J.K. & J.Park, 2013 (South Korea)
- Carabus monilifer tangweiae Deuve & Li, 2001 (China)
- Carabus monilifer yanggangensis Deuve & Li in Deuve, 2000 (North Korea)
- Carabus monilifer yichunensis Deuve & Li, 1999 (North Korea)
- Carabus monilifer zhongtiaoshanus Imura & Yamaya, 1994 (China)
