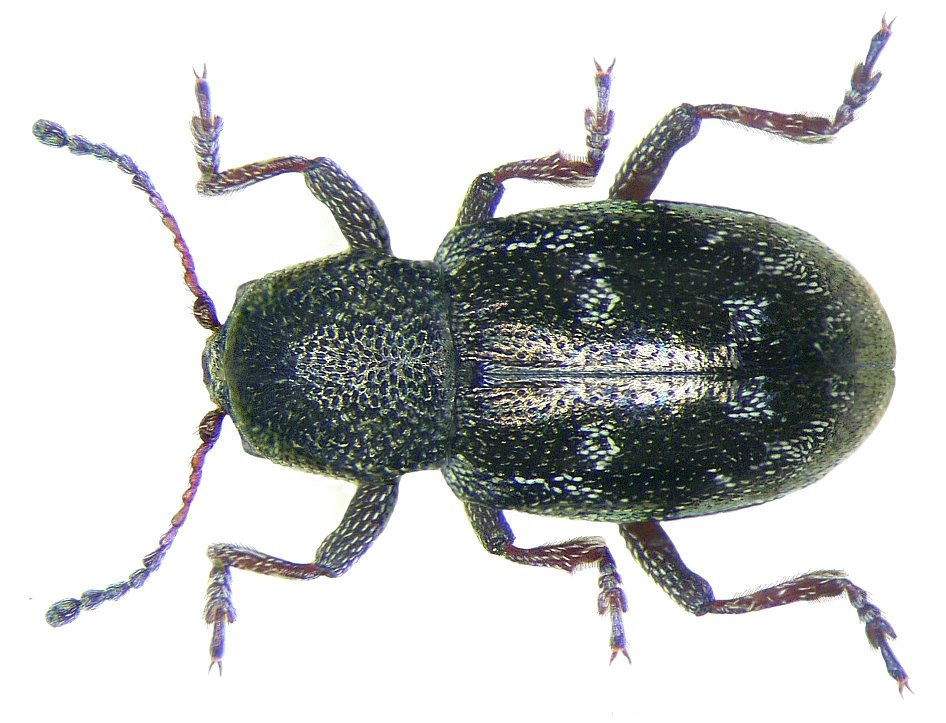
- Pachnephorus villosus
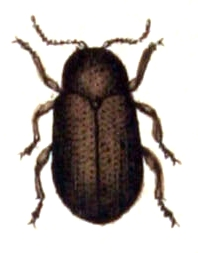
- Pachnephorus pilosus

Scientific classification
- Kingdom: Animalia
- Phylum: Arthropoda
- Clade: Pancrustacea
- Class: Insecta
- Order: Coleoptera
- Suborder: Polyphaga
- Infraorder: Cucujiformia
- Family: Chrysomelidae
- Subfamily: Eumolpinae
- Tribe: Bromiini
- Genus: Pachnephorus; Chevrolat in Dejean, 1836

Type species
- Cryptocephalus arenarius (= Cryptocephalus pilosus Rossi, 1790) Panzer, 1797

Synonyms
- Euchthonius Gistel, 1856

= Pachnephorus =

Genus of leaf beetles from Africa

Pachnephorus is a genus of leaf beetles in the subfamily Eumolpinae. It is distributed in Africa, Asia and Europe.

== Species ==
The following species are included in the genus:

Subgenus Pachnephorus

- Pachnephorus achardi Zoia, 2007 – Mali
- Pachnephorus aequatorianus Zoia, 2007 – DR Congo
- Pachnephorus aethiopicus Zoia, 2007 – Ethiopia
- Pachnephorus anceyi Pic, 1921
- Pachnephorus baehri Zoia, 2007 – Namibia
- Pachnephorus balyi Zoia, 2007 – Angola
- Pachnephorus beharui Zoia, 2007 – Ethiopia
- Pachnephorus bertiae Zoia, 2007 – Madagascar
- Pachnephorus bezdeki Zoia, 2007 – DR Congo
- Pachnephorus bistriatus Mulsant & Wachanru, 1852 – southern Europe, Turkey, Sinai Peninsula, North Africa, India, Sri Lanka, Philippines, Sulawesi (Makassar)
- Pachnephorus bracarumvestitus Zoia, 2007 – DR Congo, Zambia
- Pachnephorus bruckii Fairmaire, 1862 – France, Italy, Spain
- Pachnephorus brunneus Medvedev, 1957 – Turkmenistan
- Pachnephorus bryanti Zoia, 2007 – Mali
- Pachnephorus burgeoni Zoia, 2007 – South Africa
- Pachnephorus camerunensis Zoia, 2007 – Cameroon
- Pachnephorus canus Weise, 1882 – Albania, Bulgaria, Greece, Italy, southern European Russia, Turkey, Ukraine, Turkmenistan
- Pachnephorus clypeatus Baly, 1867 – Halmahera
- Pachnephorus conspersus Gerstaecker, 1871 – Kenya, Tanzania
- Pachnephorus corinthius Fairmaire, 1862 – Albania, Greece, Italy, Turkey
- Pachnephorus cristiani Zoia, 2007 – DR Congo, Angola, Namibia, Botswana, Zimbabwe, Mozambique
- Pachnephorus crocodilinus Zoia, 2007 – widespread in sub-Saharan Africa
- Pachnephorus curtus Pic, 1921 – China
- Pachnephorus cylindricus H. Lucas, 1846 – France, Portugal, Spain, Algeria, Morocco, Tunisia
- Pachnephorus daccordii Zoia, 2007 – Saudi Arabia, Yemen
- Pachnephorus danielssoni Zoia, 2007
  - Pachnephorus danielssoni congoanus Zoia, 2007 – DR Congo
  - Pachnephorus danielssoni danielssoni Zoia, 2007 – Senegal, Sierra Leone
- Pachnephorus demeyeri Zoia, 2007 – DR Congo
- Pachnephorus episternalis Zoia, 2007 – Madagascar
- Pachnephorus fabianae Zoia, 2007 – Congo, DR Congo
- Pachnephorus fasciatus Burgeon, 1941
  - Pachnephorus fasciatus fasciatus Burgeon, 1941 – Cameroon, Central African Republic, Gabon, DR Congo, Angola
  - Pachnephorus fasciatus occidentalis Zoia, 2007 – Senegal, Gambia, Guinea-Bissau, Sierra Leone, Nigeria
- Pachnephorus fulvus Lopatin, 1976 – Uzbekistan
- Pachnephorus gardinii Zoia, 2007 – widespread in sub-Saharan Africa
- Pachnephorus gerstaeckeri Zoia, 2007 – Namibia
- Pachnephorus grobbelaarae Zoia, 2007 – Tanzania, Angola, Zambia, Malawi, Mozambique, South Africa
- Pachnephorus hajeki Zoia, 2007 – Madagascar
- Pachnephorus hispidulus Fairmaire, 1866 – Algeria, Morocco
- Pachnephorus kaszabi Lopatin, 1962 – Afghanistan
- Pachnephorus laevicollis Fairmaire, 1862 – Italy, Spain, Algeria, Morocco
- Pachnephorus lateralis Reitter, 1901 – southern European Russia, Ukraine, Georgia, Turkey
- Pachnephorus latior Pic, 1921 – Madagascar
- Pachnephorus lewisi Baly, 1878 – China, Taiwan, India, North Korea, Nepal, Myanmar, Thailand, Cambodia, Laos, Vietnam, Philippines, Sumatra
- Pachnephorus lopatini Zoia, 2007 – Senegal
- Pachnephorus malicus Zoia, 2007 – Mali
- Pachnephorus maroantsetranus Zoia, 2007 – Madagascar
- Pachnephorus medvedevi Zoia, 2007 – Zambia, DR Congo
- Pachnephorus metallicus Bryant, 1959 – South Africa
- Pachnephorus moseykoi Zoia, 2007 – widespread in sub-Saharan Africa
- Pachnephorus pacificus Zoia, 2007 – Central African Republic
- Pachnephorus parentorum Zoia, 2007 – Ghana
- Pachnephorus pilosus (Rossi, 1790) – widespread in Europe and Asia
- Pachnephorus poggii Zoia, 2007 – Somalia, Kenya
- Pachnephorus porosus Baly, 1878 – China, Taiwan, India, North Korea, Nepal, Russian Far East, South Korea, Myanmar, Thailand, Laos, Vietnam
- Pachnephorus regalini Zoia, 2007 – Zambia
- Pachnephorus rigatoi Zoia, 2007 – Ethiopia, Somalia, Kenya
- Pachnephorus robustus Desbrochers des Loges, 1870 – southern European Russia, Ukraine, Turkey
- Pachnephorus ruficornis Lefèvre, 1876 – Armenia, Iran, Iraq, Jordan, Syria, Turkey
- Pachnephorus sassii Zoia, 2007 – Guinea-Bissau
- Pachnephorus senegalensis Achard, 1914 – widespread in sub-Saharan Africa
- Pachnephorus shuteae Zoia, 2007 – South Africa
- Pachnephorus sprecherae Zoia, 2007 – Madagascar
- Pachnephorus syriacus Reitter, 1886 – Israel
- Pachnephorus tessellatus (Duftschmid, 1825) – widespread in Europe and Asia
- Pachnephorus testaceipes Fairmaire, 1880 – Madagascar
- Pachnephorus torridus Baly, 1878 – widespread in sub-Saharan Africa
- Pachnephorus turcomanicus Medvedev, 1957 – Turkmenistan, Uzbekistan
- Pachnephorus uhligi Zoia, 2007 – Namibia
- Pachnephorus villosus (Duftschmid, 1825) – widespread in Europe and Asia
- Pachnephorus vitticollis Baly, 1867 – Bacan Islands
- Pachnephorus willersi Zoia, 2007 – Namibia
- Pachnephorus yemenicus Lopatin, 2001 – Yemen

Subgenus Pachnephoriscus Lopatin, 1976

- Pachnephorus jacobsoni Lopatin, 1976 – Uzbekistan

Synonyms:

- Pachnephorus baeticus Weise, 1882: synonym of Pachnephorus bruckii Fairmaire, 1862
- Pachnephorus convexicollis Baly, 1867: synonym of Pachnephorus bistriatus Mulsant & Wachanru, 1852
- Pachnephorus graecus Pic, 1901: synonym of Pachnephorus corinthius Fairmaire, 1862
