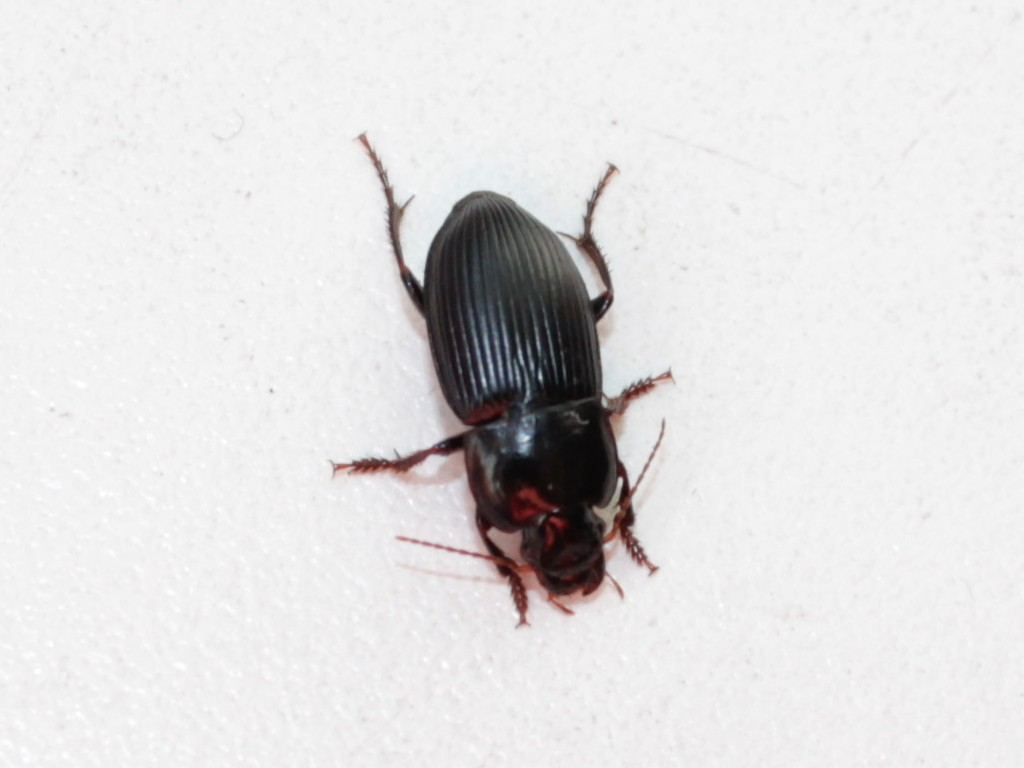

Scientific classification
- Kingdom: Animalia
- Phylum: Arthropoda
- Class: Insecta
- Order: Coleoptera
- Suborder: Adephaga
- Family: Carabidae
- Genus: Harpalus
- Species: H. anxius

Binomial name
- Harpalus anxius (Duftschmid, 1812)

Synonyms
- Carabus anxius Duftschmid, 1812; Harpalus friulanus G. Muller, 1926; Harpalus tibialis Audinet-Serville, 1821

= Harpalus anxius =

Species of beetle

Harpalus anxius is a species of phytophagous and xerophilous ground beetle that is native to Palearctic realm.

== Description ==
The species is 6.8–8.2 millimetres (0.27–0.32 in) long and is black coloured.

== Distribution ==
Its range includes Europe and the Near East. In Europe it is only absent in the following countries or islands: Andorra, the Azores, the Canary Islands, the Channel Islands, Crete, Cyclades, Cyprus, Dodecanese, the Faroe Islands, Franz Josef Land, Gibraltar, Iceland, Madeira, Malta, Monaco, the North Aegean islands, Norway, Novaya Zemlya, Portugal, San Marino, the Savage Islands, Sicily, Svalbard and Jan Mayen, and Vatican City. Its presence on the Balearic Islands and Sardinia is doubtful. In Ireland it can be found in Meath and Kerry counties.

== Habitat ==
Harpalus anxius prefers sandy heath and dunes.
