= Scriba =

Scriba may refer to:

- Scriba, New York
- the Latin word scriba meaning scribe or scrivener
  - Scriba (ancient Rome), a public notary or clerk of the ancient Roman government
  - Scriba (surname), index of people with the surname
- Serranus scriba, the painted comber
