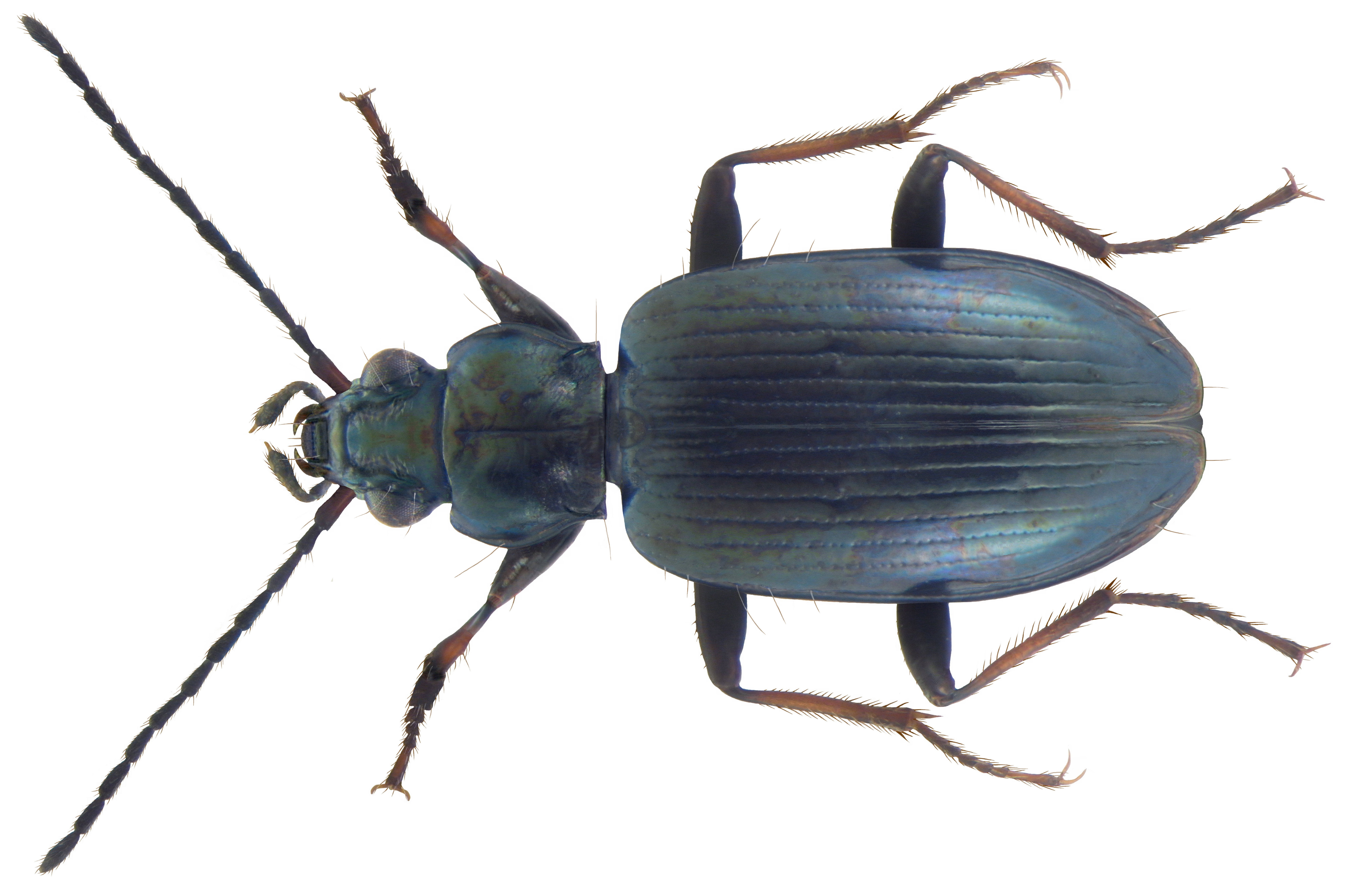

Scientific classification
- Kingdom: Animalia
- Phylum: Arthropoda
- Class: Insecta
- Order: Coleoptera
- Suborder: Adephaga
- Family: Carabidae
- Genus: Bembidion
- Species: B. tibiale

Binomial name
- Bembidion tibiale (Duftschmid, 1812)

= Bembidion tibiale =

Species of beetle

Bembidion tibiale is a species of ground beetle native to Europe.

The ground beetle is usually 5.5-6.5mm, long, black, with strong metallic blue or green reflections.
