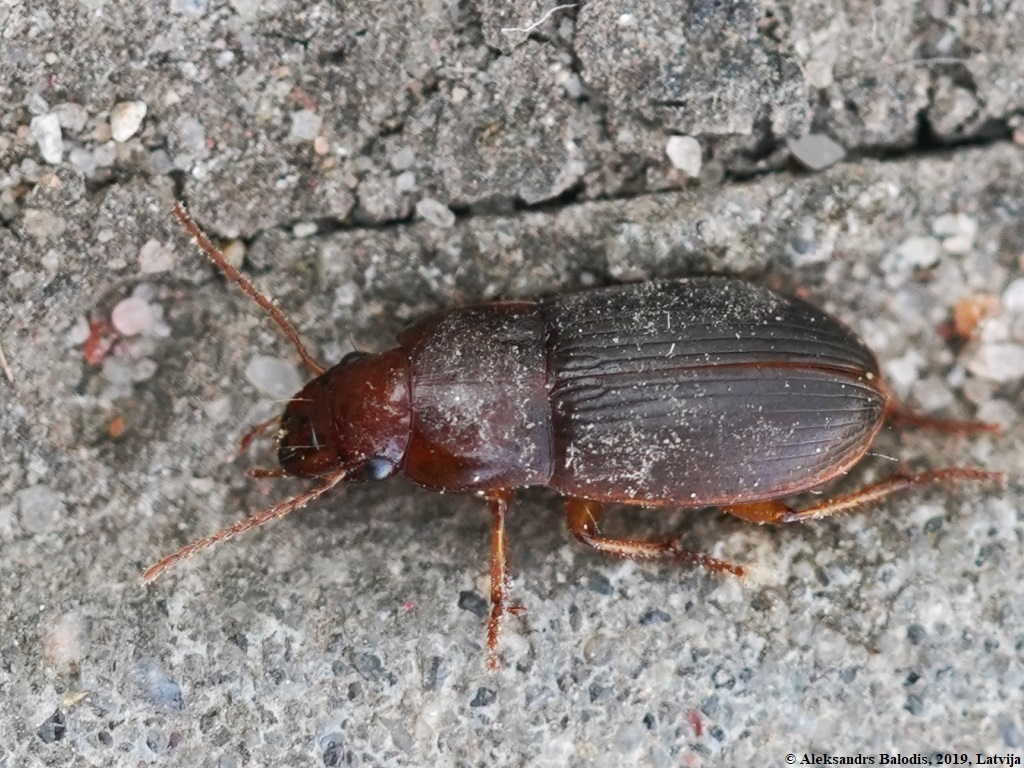

Scientific classification
- Kingdom: Animalia
- Phylum: Arthropoda
- Class: Insecta
- Order: Coleoptera
- Suborder: Adephaga
- Family: Carabidae
- Genus: Harpalus
- Species: H. luteicornis

Binomial name
- Harpalus luteicornis (Duftschmid, 1812)

= Harpalus luteicornis =

Species of beetle

Harpalus luteicornis is a species of ground beetle native to the Palearctic realm, including Europe and the Near East. In Europe, it is found in mostly Central and Eastern part of the continent. It is found in the following European countries or unions: Austria, Baltic states, Belarus, Benelux, Bosnia and Herzegovina, Croatia, France, Germany, Hungary, Liechtenstein, Moldova, Poland, Romania, Russia, Scandinavia (except for Denmark), Slovakia, Slovenia, Switzerland, and Ukraine. It is also exists in Mongolia.

== Description ==
The species is 6–8 millimetres (0.24–0.31 in) in length and is black coloured with orange legs and antennas.

== Distribution and threat level ==
The species is considered to be rare in Flanders, Belgium and throughout the nation. It was put on Red List in Belgium on September 22, 1980.
