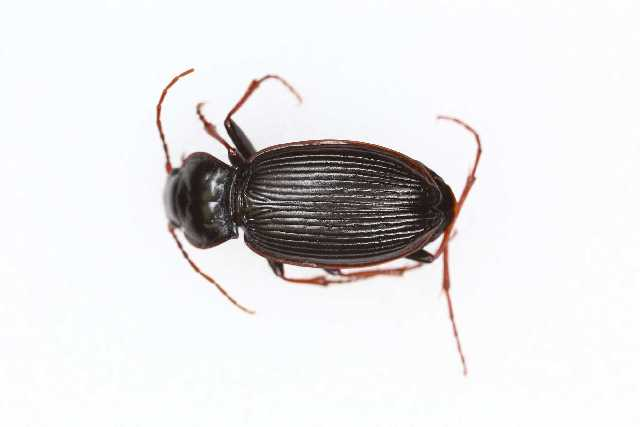

Scientific classification
- Domain: Eukaryota
- Kingdom: Animalia
- Phylum: Arthropoda
- Class: Insecta
- Order: Coleoptera
- Suborder: Adephaga
- Family: Carabidae
- Subfamily: Nebriinae
- Tribe: Nebriini
- Genus: Nebria
- Species: N. dahlii

Binomial name
- Nebria dahlii (Duftschmid, 1812)

Synonyms
- Carabus dahlii (Duftschmid, 1812); Nebria Alpaeonebria Csiki, 1946; Nebria Alpaeus Bonelli, 1810; Nebria Harpazobia Gistel, 1856; Nebria Helobia Curtis, 1826; Nebria Helobium Leach, 1815

= Nebria dahlii =

Species of beetle

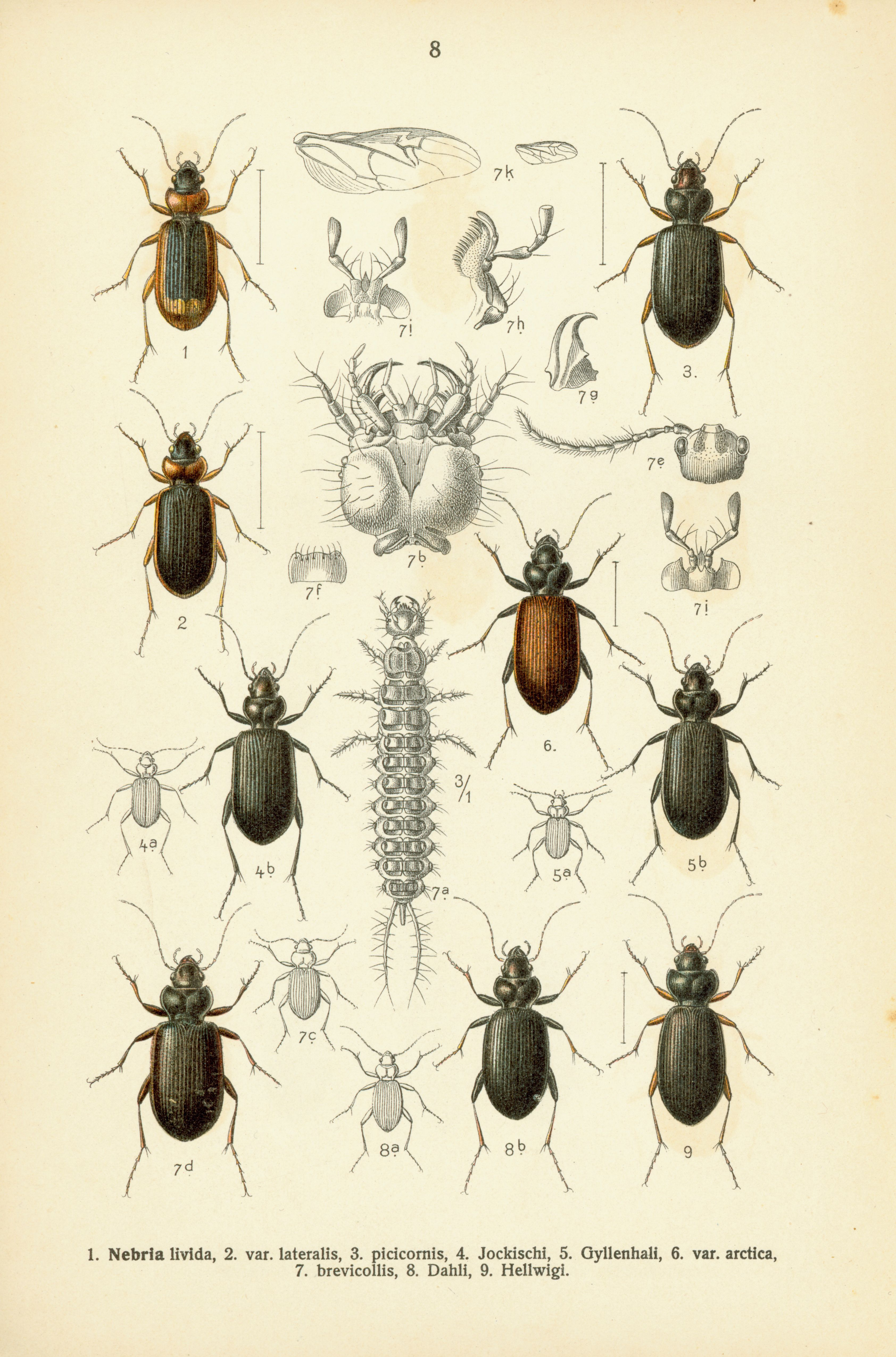
Size comparison of the Nebria Dahlii, comparison (8a) and adult (8b). Dorsal view

Nebria dahlii is a species in the beetle family Carabidae, found in Europe.

== Subspecies ==
These four subspecies belong to the species Nebria dahlii:

- Nebria dahlii dahlii (Duftschmid, 1812) (Austria, Italy, and Slovenia)
- Nebria dahlii littoralis Dejean, 1826 (Croatia)
- Nebria dahlii montenegrina Apfelbeck, 1904 (Bosnia-Herzegovina, (former) Yugoslavia, and Albania)
- Nebria dahlii velebitica Heyden, 1884 (Croatia)
