= Pachnephorus tessellatus =

Scientific classification
- Kingdom: Animalia
- Phylum: Arthropoda
- Clade: Pancrustacea
- Class: Insecta
- Order: Coleoptera
- Suborder: Polyphaga
- Infraorder: Cucujiformia
- Family: Chrysomelidae
- Genus: Pachnephorus
- Subgenus: Pachnephorus (Pachnephorus)
- Species: P. tessellatus

Binomial name
- Pachnephorus tessellatus (Duftschmid, 1825)

Synonyms
- Eumolpus sabulosus Gebler, 1830; Eumolpus tessellatus Duftschmid, 1825; Myochrous albovillosus Jacoby, 1882; Pachnephorus arenarius Küster, 1846

Species of beetle

Pachnephorus tessellatus is a species of leaf beetle in the subfamily Eumolpinae. It is widely distributed across Europe and Asia, and is also present on the Canary Islands. It was first described by Caspar Erasmus Duftschmid in 1825.

Myochrous albovillosus, a synonym of P. tessellatus, was described from "Mexico" by Martin Jacoby in 1882. However, Doris Holmes Blake, who determined the two species to be the same, thought this reported locality to be due to a mistake in locality labels.
