= Pachnephorus crocodilinus =

Scientific classification
- Kingdom: Animalia
- Phylum: Arthropoda
- Clade: Pancrustacea
- Class: Insecta
- Order: Coleoptera
- Suborder: Polyphaga
- Infraorder: Cucujiformia
- Family: Chrysomelidae
- Genus: Pachnephorus
- Subgenus: Pachnephorus (Pachnephorus)
- Species: P. crocodilinus

Binomial name
- Pachnephorus crocodilinus Zoia, 2007

Species of beetle

Pachnephorus crocodilinus is a species of leaf beetle that is widely distributed in sub-Saharan Africa, described by Stefano Zoia in 2007. Its name is derived from the Latin crocodilus ("crocodile"), referring to both the species' type locality (Mfuwe Crocodile Farm, in South Luangwa National Park, Zambia) and the fact that Pachnephorus species, like crocodiles, usually live near water.

== Distribution ==
P. crocodilinus is recorded from Sudan, Ethiopia, Nigeria, Cameroon, the Democratic Republic of the Congo, Tanzania, Namibia, Zambia, Malawi, Mozambique and South Africa. Some specimens of the species from western Africa (Senegal, Ghana, Gabon and Mali) are also known, but with doubt.
