= Pachnephorus bryanti =

Scientific classification
- Kingdom: Animalia
- Phylum: Arthropoda
- Clade: Pancrustacea
- Class: Insecta
- Order: Coleoptera
- Suborder: Polyphaga
- Infraorder: Cucujiformia
- Family: Chrysomelidae
- Genus: Pachnephorus
- Subgenus: Pachnephorus (Pachnephorus)
- Species: P. bryanti

Binomial name
- Pachnephorus bryanti Zoia, 2007

Species of beetle

Pachnephorus bryanti is a species of leaf beetle found in Mali, described by Stefano Zoia in 2007. It is named after the British entomologist Gilbert Ernest Bryant.
