= Pachnephorus torridus =

Scientific classification
- Kingdom: Animalia
- Phylum: Arthropoda
- Clade: Pancrustacea
- Class: Insecta
- Order: Coleoptera
- Suborder: Polyphaga
- Infraorder: Cucujiformia
- Family: Chrysomelidae
- Genus: Pachnephorus
- Subgenus: Pachnephorus (Pachnephorus)
- Species: P. torridus

Binomial name
- Pachnephorus torridus Baly, 1878

Synonyms
- Pachnephorus costatus Achard, 1914

Species of beetle

Pachnephorus torridus is a species of leaf beetle that is widely distributed in sub-Saharan Africa, described by Joseph Sugar Baly in 1878.

== Distribution ==
P. torridus is recorded from Senegal, Gambia, Guinea Bissau, Sierra Leone, Mali, Ivory Coast, Burkina Faso, Togo, Niger, Nigeria, Chad, Sudan, Cameroon, the Central African Republic, Ethiopia, Equatorial Guinea, Gabon, the Republic of the Congo, the Democratic Republic of the Congo, Kenya, Tanzania, Zambia, Malawi, Namibia, Mozambique and South Africa.
