= Pachnephorus senegalensis =

Scientific classification
- Kingdom: Animalia
- Phylum: Arthropoda
- Clade: Pancrustacea
- Class: Insecta
- Order: Coleoptera
- Suborder: Polyphaga
- Infraorder: Cucujiformia
- Family: Chrysomelidae
- Genus: Pachnephorus
- Subgenus: Pachnephorus (Pachnephorus)
- Species: P. senegalensis

Binomial name
- Pachnephorus senegalensis Achard, 1914

Species of beetle

Pachnephorus senegalensis is a species of leaf beetle that is widely distributed in sub-Saharan Africa, described by Julien Achard in 1914.

== Distribution ==
P. senegalensis is recorded from Senegal, Gambia, Guinea Bissau, Mali, Togo, Benin, Nigeria, Chad, Ethiopia, the Democratic Republic of the Congo, Tanzania and Zambia.
