= Pachnephorus gardinii =

Scientific classification
- Kingdom: Animalia
- Phylum: Arthropoda
- Clade: Pancrustacea
- Class: Insecta
- Order: Coleoptera
- Suborder: Polyphaga
- Infraorder: Cucujiformia
- Family: Chrysomelidae
- Genus: Pachnephorus
- Subgenus: Pachnephorus (Pachnephorus)
- Species: P. gardinii

Binomial name
- Pachnephorus gardinii Zoia, 2007

Species of beetle

Pachnephorus gardinii is a species of leaf beetle that is widely distributed in sub-Saharan Africa, described by Stefano Zoia in 2007. It is named after Giulio Gardini, a friend of the author.

== Distribution ==
P. gardinii is recorded from Senegal, Gambia, Guinea Bissau, Mali, Ivory Coast, Nigeria, Chad, Cameroon, Sudan, Ethiopia, Kenya, the Republic of the Congo, the Democratic Republic of the Congo, Rwanda and Tanzania.
