= Pachnephorus fabianae =

Scientific classification
- Kingdom: Animalia
- Phylum: Arthropoda
- Clade: Pancrustacea
- Class: Insecta
- Order: Coleoptera
- Suborder: Polyphaga
- Infraorder: Cucujiformia
- Family: Chrysomelidae
- Genus: Pachnephorus
- Subgenus: Pachnephorus (Pachnephorus)
- Species: P. fabianae

Binomial name
- Pachnephorus fabianae Zoia, 2007

Species of beetle

Pachnephorus fabianae is a species of leaf beetle found in the Republic of the Congo and the Democratic Republic of the Congo, described by Stefano Zoia in 2007. A single specimen of the species from Zambia is also known, but with doubt. It is named after the author's wife, Fabiana.
