= Pachnephorus demeyeri =

Scientific classification
- Kingdom: Animalia
- Phylum: Arthropoda
- Clade: Pancrustacea
- Class: Insecta
- Order: Coleoptera
- Suborder: Polyphaga
- Infraorder: Cucujiformia
- Family: Chrysomelidae
- Genus: Pachnephorus
- Subgenus: Pachnephorus (Pachnephorus)
- Species: P. demeyeri

Binomial name
- Pachnephorus demeyeri Zoia, 2007

Species of beetle

Pachnephorus demeyeri is a species of leaf beetle found in the Democratic Republic of the Congo, described by Stefano Zoia in 2007. It is named after Marc de Meyer, for helping Zoia during his visits to the Royal Museum for Central Africa.
