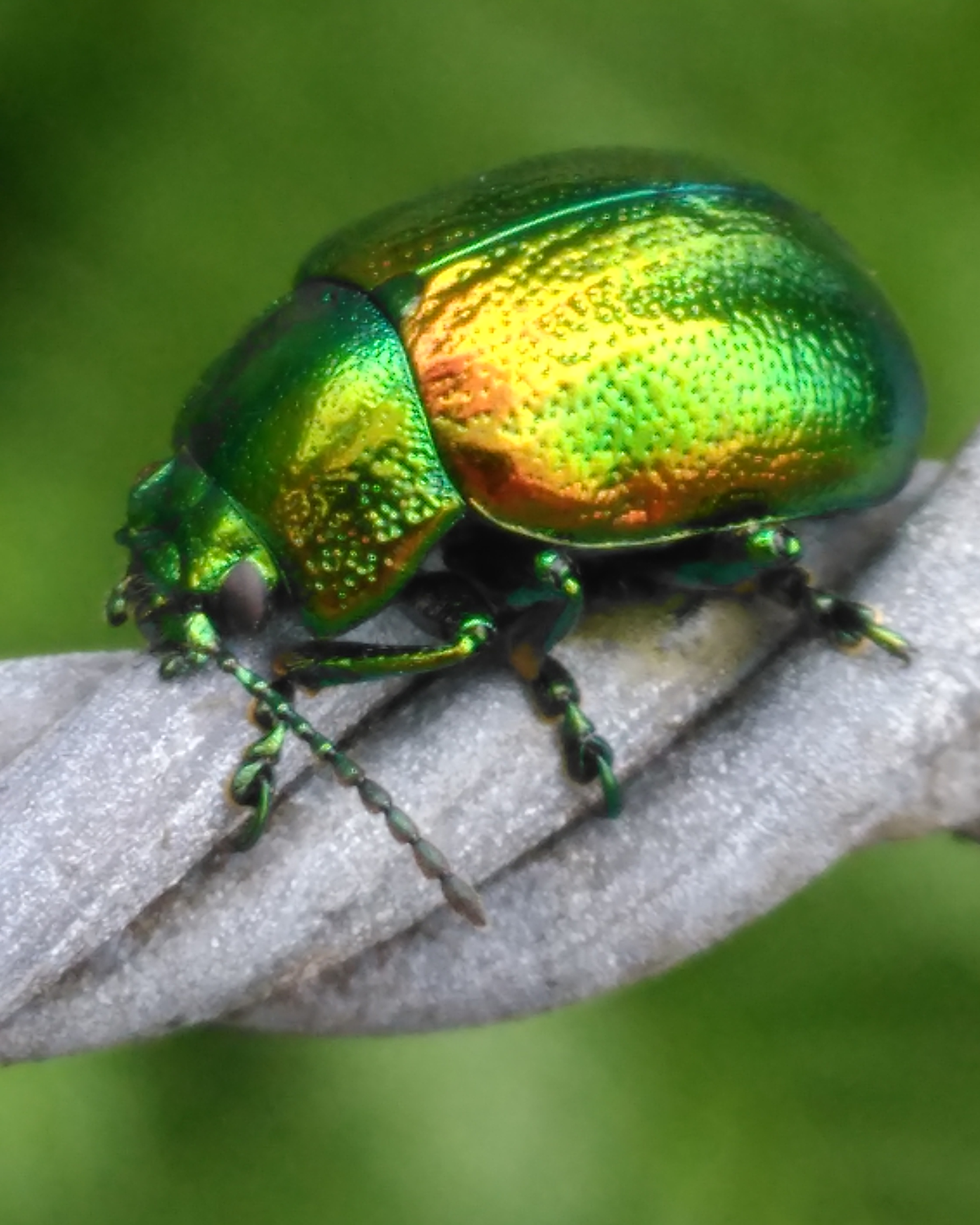

Scientific classification
- Kingdom: Animalia
- Phylum: Arthropoda
- Clade: Pancrustacea
- Class: Insecta
- Order: Coleoptera
- Suborder: Polyphaga
- Infraorder: Cucujiformia
- Family: Chrysomelidae
- Genus: Chrysolina
- Subgenus: Euchrysolina
- Species: C. graminis

Binomial name
- Chrysolina graminis (Linnaeus, 1758)

Synonyms
- Chrysomela fulgida Fabricius, 1801; Chrysomela graminis Linnaeus, 1758; Chrysolina nigrocuprea Mallet, 1924; Chrysolina taupini Mallet, 1924

= Tansy beetle =

Species of beetle

The tansy beetle (Chrysolina graminis) is a species of leaf beetle. The common name derives from its main foodplant, tansy (Tanacetum vulgare), but it can also use other wetland plants such as gypsywort (Lycopus europaeus) and water mint (Mentha aquatica). It measures 7.7–10.5 mm in length and has a characteristic bright metallic green colouration, with pitted elytra and a coppery tinge. In addition to the nominotypical subspecies, which repeats the specific name, C. graminis graminis, there are five further distinct subspecies of tansy beetle, which, collectively, have a Palearctic distribution, although in the majority of countries where it is found the species is declining. In the United Kingdom it is designated as 'Nationally Rare'. The stronghold population here is located along the banks of the river Ouse in York, North Yorkshire. Other, small, fenland populations exist at Woodwalton Fen and at Welney Wildfowl and Wetlands Trust (WWT) reserve.

== Taxonomy ==
The tansy beetle was first described by Carl Linnaeus in his landmark 1758 10th edition of Systema Naturae as Chrysomela graminis and was later transferred to the genus Chrysolina. The genus Chrysolina currently contains 39 subgenera. C. graminis (with its several subspecies) is located in the subgenus Euchrysolina which contains only one other species – C. virgata; this subgenus was first established in 1950.

Its specific name graminis is a form of the Latin noun gramen, meaning "of grass" or "grass-like". Chrysolina graminis sensu lato has at least three later binomial names which are considered to be synonyms: Chrysomela fulgida Fabricius, 1801, Chrysolina nigrocuprea Mallet, 1924, and Chrysolina taupini Mallet, 1924.

There are six subspecies of tansy beetle. The nominotypical subspecies C. graminis graminis was established via the original description of the species in 1758. C. graminis santonici (named after the Italian name, Santonico, for its host plant Artemisia caerulescens) was described by N. B. Contarini in 1847. In 1860 Victor Motschulsky described two subspecies – C. graminis artemisiae and C. graminis auraria. These were added to in the 20th century with C. graminis christianae (Mallet, 1933) and C. graminis mediterranea Bechyné, 1950.

The subspecies of C. graminis have localised distributions: C. graminis artemisiae is located in south-east Europe, central Asia, and southern Siberia; C. graminis auraria is located in Dauria, eastern Mongolia, and China; C. graminis christianae is located in France; C. graminis mediterranea is located in Corsica and Spain; C. graminis santonici is located in the central Alps.

== Description ==
All tansy beetles are small, rounded beetles approximately 7–12 mm in length. There are both internal and external morphological differences between the six subspecies.

Morphological features of tansy beetle subspecies
Subspecies	Description
C. graminis graminis	The nominotypical subspecies of tansy beetles (C. graminis graminis) are small, rounded beetles 7.7–10.5 mm in length. The body is dorsally bright green, the elytra mostly with golden-red or golden lateral margins and stripe near the suture. The iridescence on the elytra visibly contrasts with the head and pronotum. The punctuation on the elytra is easily visible by eye, but any punctuation is very difficult to see on the pronotum (with the exception of the side margins). There is a smooth lip running the entire length of the ventral edge of the elytra. The aedeagus is narrowed at the apex, without teeth on the underside.
C. graminis auraria	9.5–11.4 mm in length, with the deep lateral depressions of the pronotum developed only in its basal half.
C. graminis mediterranea	10–12 mm in length with a more finely punctuated pronotum than the nominotypical species. The elytral punctuation is slightly rougher, except at the scutellum, and the central margin is wider than in C. graminis graminis, but poorly distinct across its entire length.
C. graminis santonici	Described as having black mouth parts and palps, green elytra, and a red abdomen with four brown spots evident.

=== Larvae ===
The larvae of C. graminis have four instar stages, though the first instar may not possess the characteristics of the later instars. Larvae are brown, and dorsally convex with spiracles evident on eight segments. They usually have small, indistinct tubercles with very short setae. The head of each larva is a darker brown than the body and has six ocelli on each side. The mandibles have five apical teeth.

=== Distinguishing Chrysolina graminis and Chrysolina herbacea ===
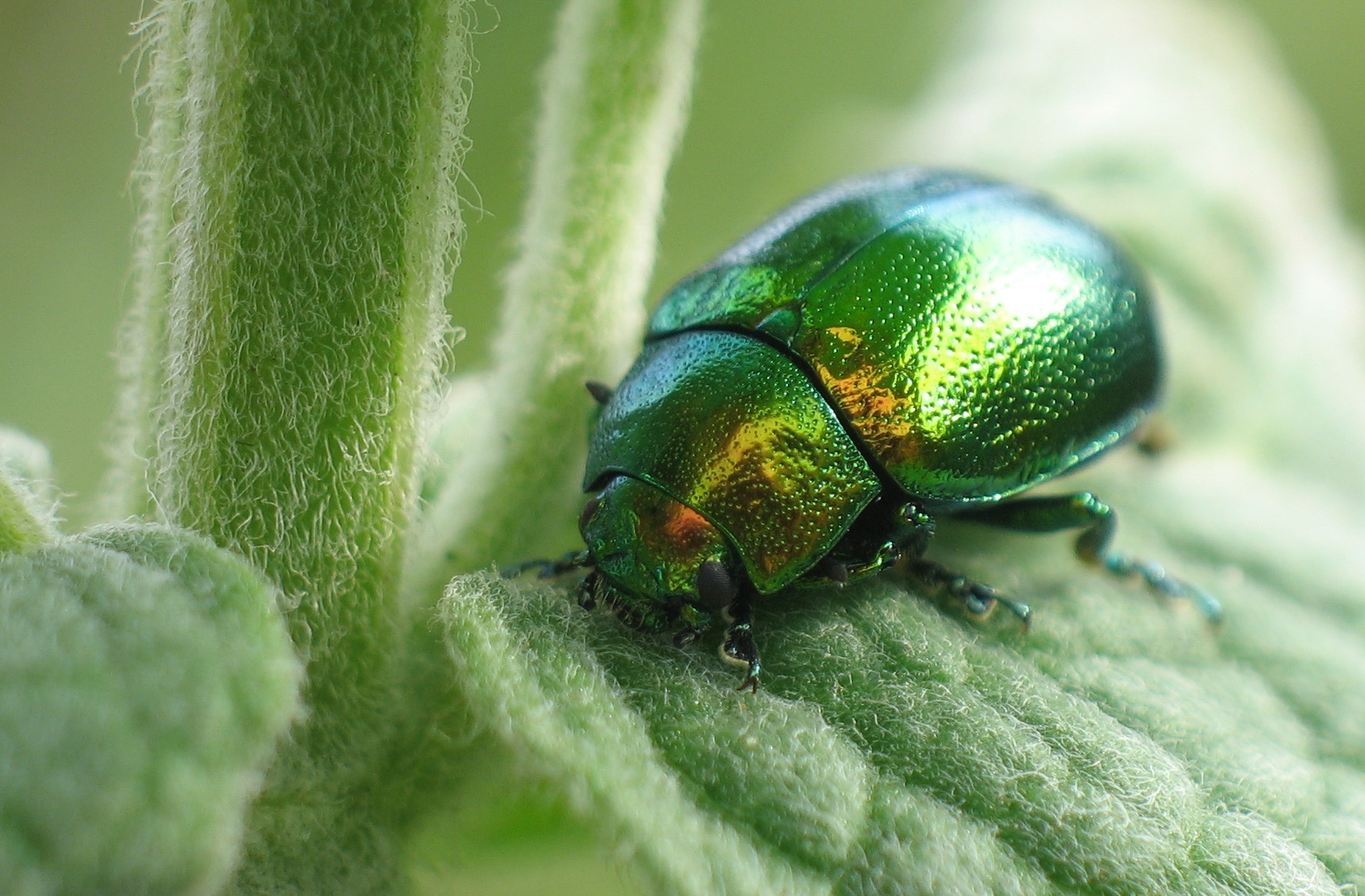
The mint leaf beetle (Chrysolina herbacea)

Chrysolina graminis and C. herbacea are similar in size and colour and may be confused in UK populations. Distinguishing the two species in the United Kingdom is particularly important as C. graminis is a vulnerable species whereas C. herbacea is much more common. This has previously led to the misidentification of C. herbacea as C. graminis. C. herbacea measures 7–11 mm in length. It is coloured iridescent green on dorsal surface throughout. The punctuation on the pronotum and elytra is distinctly similar, unlike in C. graminis. There is a smooth lip running only half the length of the ventral edge of the elytra, whereas this lip runs the full length on C. graminis.

== Distribution and habitat ==
The tansy beetle has a Palearctic distribution. Evidence from archaeological excavation has shown that its presence in western Europe is confirmed at least as early as the Neolithic period. The beetles may be found on tansy (Tanacetum vulgare) and water mint (Mentha aquatica) in fen land and the banks of rivers with broad floodplains in Britain. Larvae are also recorded from other host plants: Achillea ptarmica (sneezewort) in France and various plants of the genus Artemisia in Russia. Adults and larvae feed on the leaves of their host plants.

=== Distribution ===
In continental Europe, C. graminis is widespread from Scandinavia to the Mediterranean Sea. It may also be found in central Asia and China. In Russia it may be found in the tundra zone from the Polar Urals to the Kolyma River, and in the nearby countries of Kazakhstan, and Mongolia. It is listed as vulnerable in Austria, Denmark, Sweden and Norway, and in Germany it is rare in one district, endangered in another.

==== United Kingdom ====
In the United Kingdom, its range is currently restricted to about 45 km of the banks of the River Ouse centred on York, North Yorkshire. Although there are scattered records from across England some of these may represent mis-identifications of the mint beetle, a more widespread species. Tansy beetles had previously been recorded from Wicken Fen, Cambridgeshire, where species of mint (Mentha spp.), not tansy, acted as the host plant. The last accurate record for the beetle at this site was in 1981. In August 2014 a new sighting was made nearby at Woodwalton Fen, following this a translocation programme of Yorkshire beetles was attempted to boost the population. However, this was unsuccessful, likely due to potentially differing biologies between the two populations.

As of 2006 there were 19 British hectads (10 km squares) with records of the tansy beetle, but it has only been seen in 11 of these since 1970, six of which are centred around York. In 2015, the total number of individuals estimated from a survey of this area on the banks of the River Ouse was 24,000. In 2016 this number increased significantly to 40,000. Since 2018, the beetle has also been discovered at the Wildfowl and Wetlands Trust (WWT) reserve at Welney, west Norfolk.

=== Threats to habitat ===
The decline in C. graminis is likely to be due to habitat loss resulting from land improvement and arable conversion, over-grazing, development, drainage and lowering of water-tables due to over-abstraction. Neglect may also lead to loss or degradation of habitat such as through over-shading or competition of food plants with invasive species such as Himalayan balsam (Impatiens glandulifera). Flood-bank works may deplete or destroy local sub-populations.

Within the York distribution the beetles are dependent on tansy as their sole food source; if a clump disappears the beetles are forced to walk to a new location as they rarely fly, despite having fully working wings and being capable of doing so. The loss of habitat impacts upon the ability of the tansy beetle to find an alternative source of the host plant. Additionally, tansy is a ruderal species and thus has a naturally high rate of turnover of plants, forcing beetles to regularly seek out new tansy patches to colonise.

A 2009 study of tansy beetle occupancy amongst 1305 patches (stems separated by no more than 50 cm) of the tansy plant on the banks of the River Ouse (York, UK) intended to establish data on the distribution of tansy plants and relate this to existing tansy beetle populations in order to contribute to the conservation effort of the species. The results were analysed using generalised additive models to conclude that the tansy patches should be managed towards volumes of 3 m^{3} and that these patches should be targeted within 200 m of existing beetle subpopulations on the same river bank in order to help the beetle population disperse and survive.

== Life cycle ==
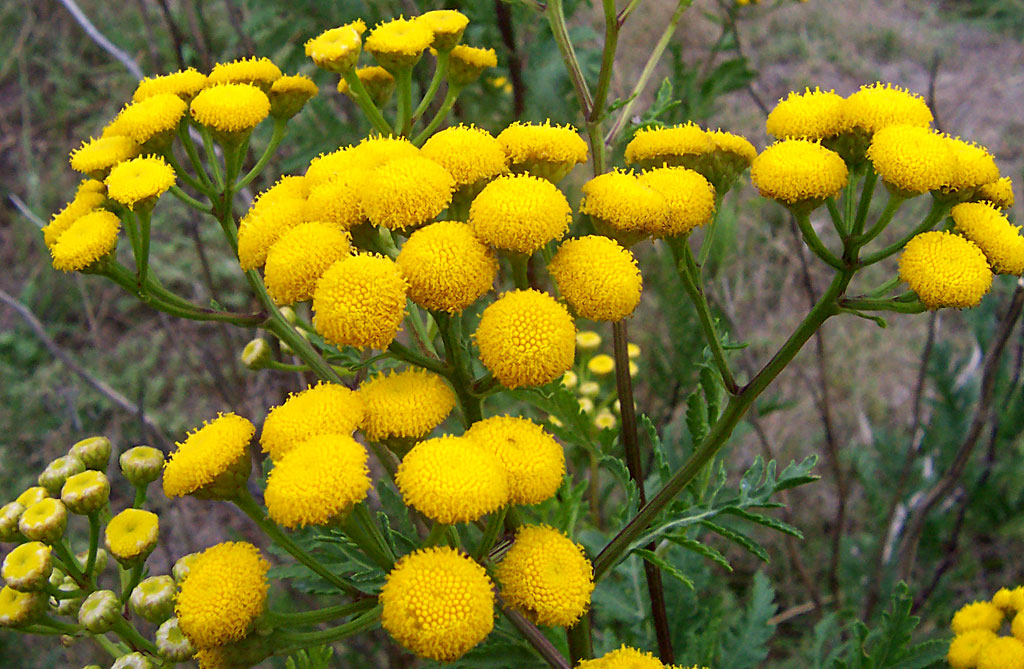
Tansy (Tanacetum vulgare), a medicinal herb

Both adults and larvae use the same host plant during their life cycle. As tansy often grows in discrete clumps, the total population of C. graminis in an area may be divided and individuals may spend their entire life cycle within an area of a few square metres.

Adults mate between March and June. In the monitored populations at York, mating of the same pair could last over 24 hours, during which time some pairs moved between tansy patches. Mating in a Russian population of C. graminis is preceded by an elaborate ritual not evident in other populations of the species, involving the male tapping the female's eyes, pronotum and antennae with its antennae. Mated females lay batches of 3–15 elongated, yellow eggs (each 2 mm long) on the underside of the tansy leaves. Eggs hatch into grey larvae. In captivity, one newly mated female produced 561 eggs over 136 days and another produced 158 eggs over 49 days. Females will lay in several locations; the average clutch size is 5–6 eggs. Female C. graminis will cannibalise the eggs of other females. In laboratory conditions, newly hatched larvae have been shown to survive for at least four days without food and thus have a long window of opportunity in which to reach a tansy plant. In July, the final instar larvae burrow underground beneath the plant to pupate, although very little is known about the biology of this process in C. graminis. Between August and September, this new adult population emerges to feed before returning underground to overwinter in October; emergence of adults is from March to April the next year. Long-term monitoring has indicated that survival during winter hibernation is surprisingly high, as autumn and spring population sizes are very similar. This is despite annual winter flooding of the River Ouse, implying that overwintering individuals must be extremely tolerant of long periods of inundation and oxygen deprivation. Approximately 5% of overwintering adults do not emerge from the soil after the winter, but remain underground for the next year in a state of extended diapause and emerge in the following spring.

A few adult beetles may overlap between the spring and summer populations, but most adults from the earlier emergence die before the end of summer. Both adult and larval tansy beetles are unable to detect their host plant, or each other, at a distance, either by smell, sight or a combination of the two. Starvation is thus likely to be a major contributor to mortality when beetles wander away from their host and become lost.

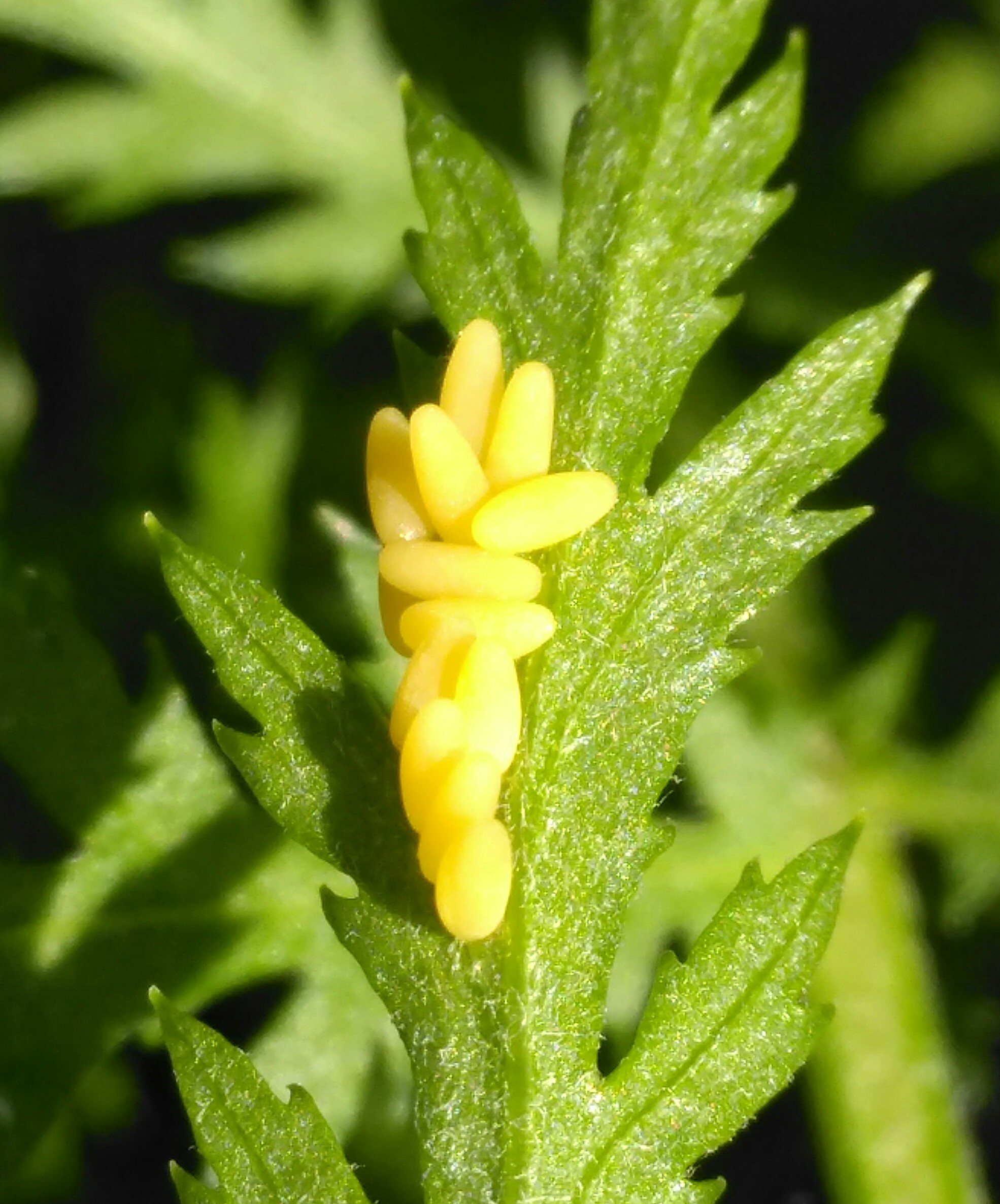
Tansy beetle eggs laid on the underside of a tansy leaf

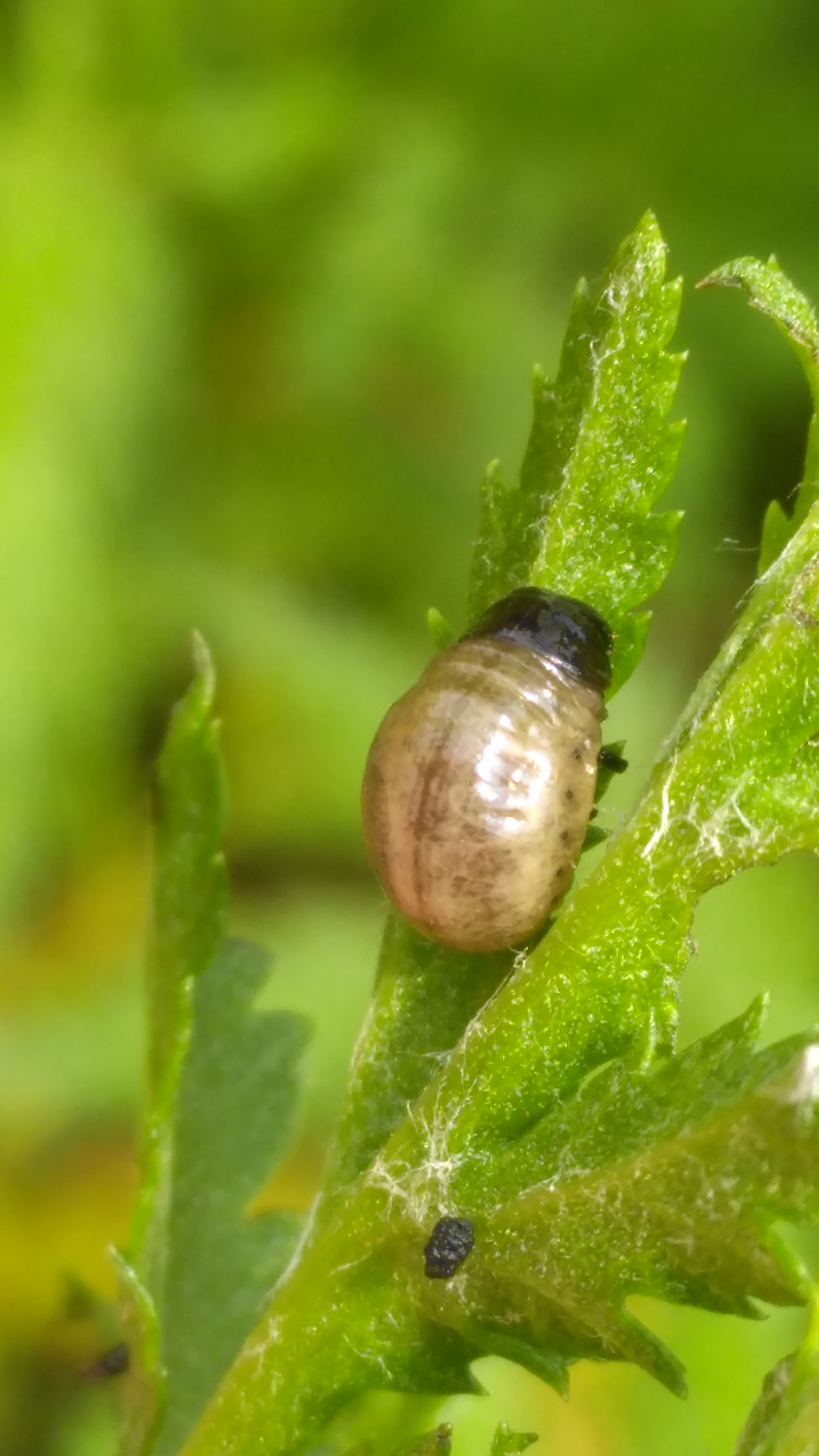
Tansy beetle larva

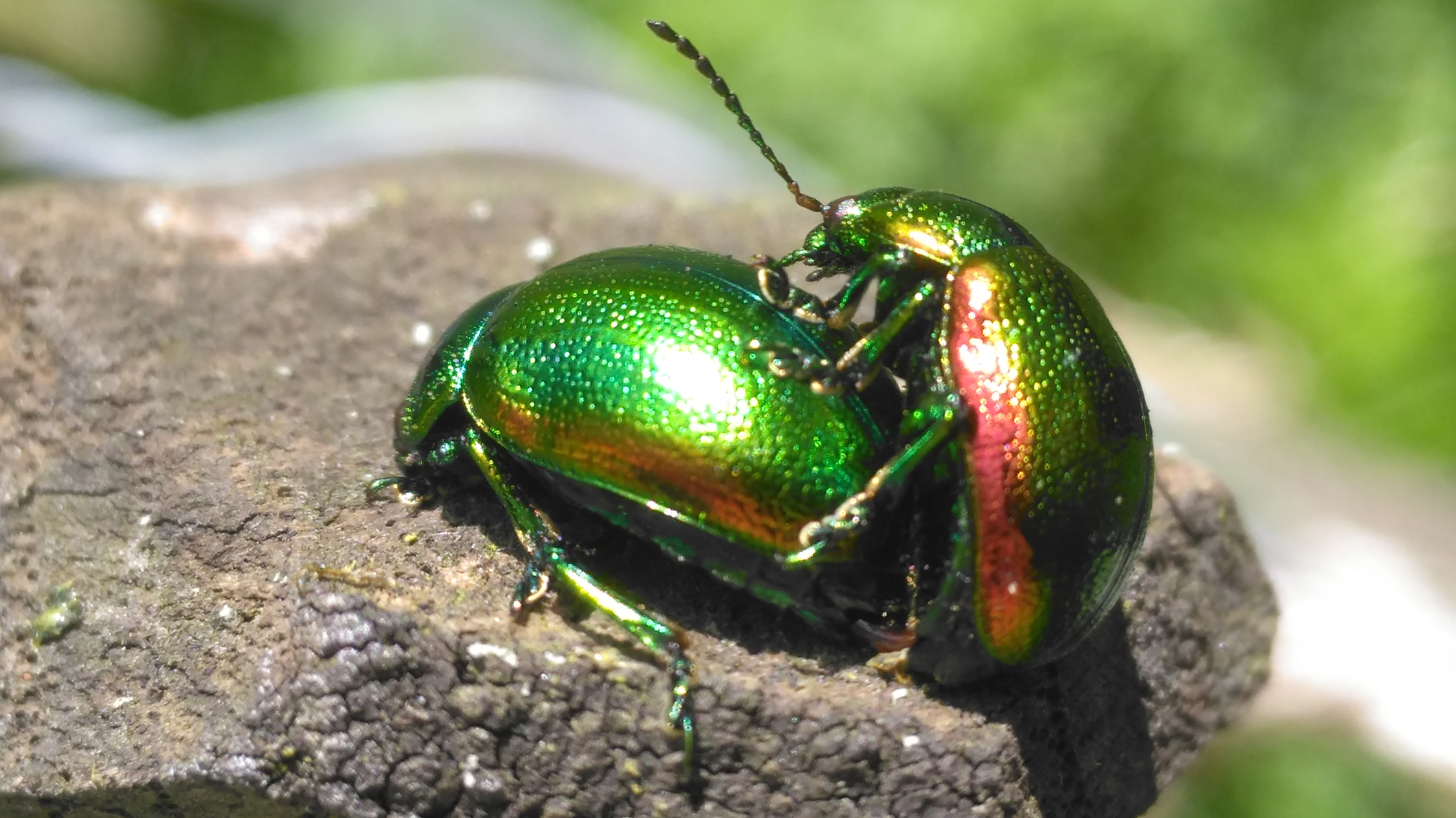
Mating pair of tansy beetles

== Behaviour and ecology ==
=== Diet ===
Tansy beetles are herbivorous and primarily use tansy (Tanacetum vulgare) as their host plant. The species has, however, also been recorded consuming a wider range of food plants including Lycopus europaeus (gipsywort), Stachys palustris (marsh woundwort), Achillea ptarmica (sneezewort), Mentha aquatica (water mint), Mentha rotundifolia (false apple mint), as well as other species of the genera Chrysanthemum, Scutellaria, and Artemisia. The subspecies C. graminis santonico is associated with Artemisa caerulescens.

The tansy plant naturally contains a number of volatile components including 1,8-cineole, trans-thujone, camphor and myrtenol, with the quantities and proportions of each varying seasonally and from plant to plant. 1,8-cineole is a toxin believed to defend the plant leaves against attacks by herbivores. The tansy beetle is resistant to these chemicals. However, tansy is a repellent to other Chrysomelid beetles. For example, the steam distillate of fresh leaves and flowers of tansy contains high levels of camphor and umbellulone and is strongly repellent to the Colorado potato beetle (Leptinotarsa decemlineata).

=== Predation ===
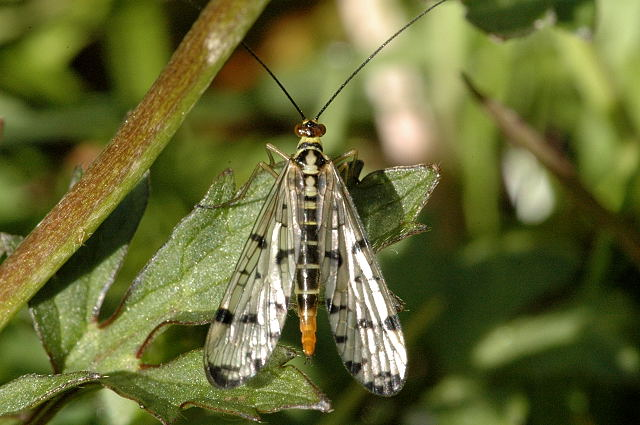
The scorpionfly Panorpa germanica has been observed preying on tansy beetle larvae.

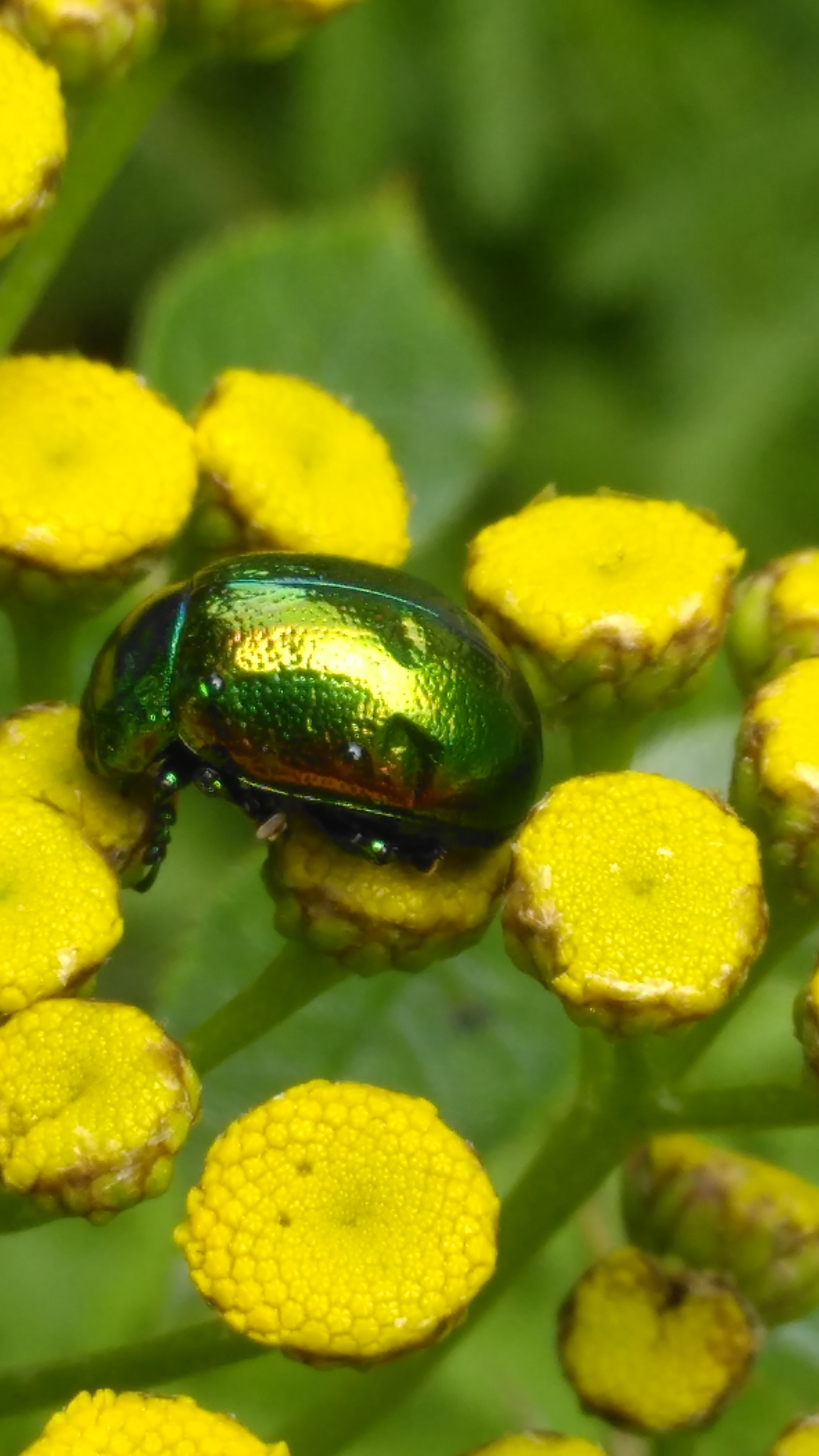
Tansy beetle with damaged elytra on tansy flower heads

Beetle remains bearing what appeared to be the marks of bird attacks have been found by the River Ouse and hardened adults often bear symmetrically indented elytra, interpreted as 'pinch marks' inflicted by a beak whilst newly emerged adults are still hardening. Dead beetles have also been found in the webs of spiders in a captive population. The accidental predation of C. graminis by livestock consuming the tansy plant is also possible. Predation of a larva by the scorpionfly Panorpa germanica has been observed in the field. The tachinid genus Macquartia exclusively parasitizes Chrysolmelid beetles and one species of which, Macquartia dispar, may parasitise C. graminis directly. The adult fly deposits fully incubated eggs or newly hatched larvae into the vicinity of the host larvae.

Larvae of other Chrysomelids are predated by birds, coccinellids, predatory bugs, lacewing larvae, syrphid larvae, carabids, ants, wasps, spiders and harvestmen, all of which are common on the tansy around the York population. The pupal stage may be directly predated by the European mole.

=== Parasites ===
A mite, Chrysomelobia mahunkai (family Podapolipidae) has been recorded from a single adult specimen of C. graminis, and Eulophus chrysomela (a species of hymenopteran of the family Eulophidae) is recorded as an endoparasite of the pupal stage.

== Relationship with humans ==
=== Conservation in the United Kingdom ===
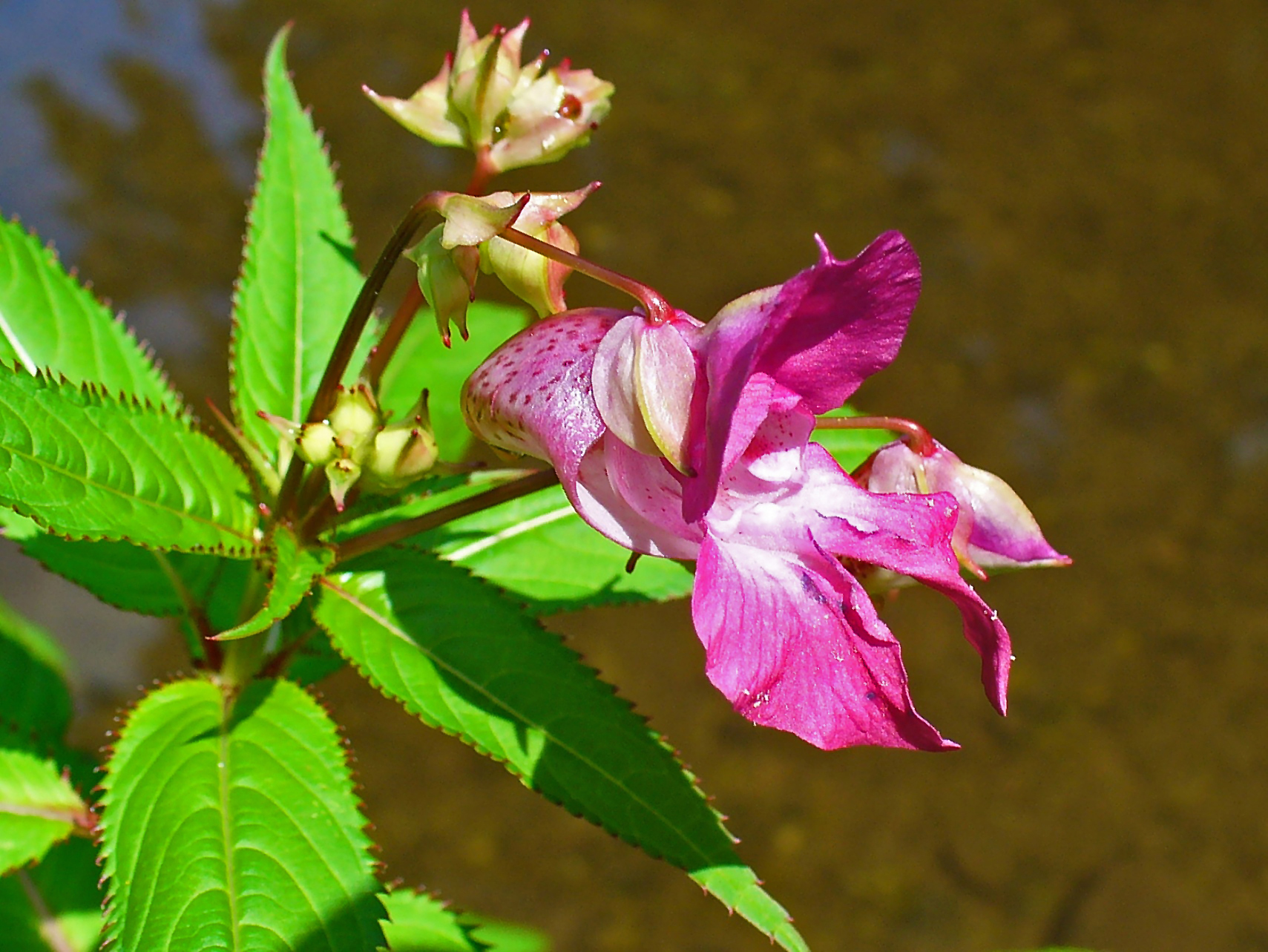
Himalayan balsam (Impatiens glandulifera) – an invasive plant competing with tansy in the UK

The species is formally designated as 'Nationally Rare' in the United Kingdom and categorised as a 'Species of Principal Importance' in accordance with the Natural Environment and Rural Communities Act 2006. The Tansy Beetle Action Group was set up in 2008 to initiate and oversee conservation efforts and comprises representatives from the University of York, North Yorkshire County Council, City of York Council, Environment Agency and the National Trust. A recovery programme started, involving annual surveys of both tansy and beetles, control of tree shading and invasive plants that compete with tansy, such as Himalayan balsam, and limited re-introductions within the current species range. New clumps of tansy have been planted, particularly between isolated existing patches which may be beyond the 200 m walking range of the beetle. In order to publicise the conservation project Rachael Maskell, the Member of Parliament for the constituency of York Central became a 'Tansy Beetle Species Champion' in 2016. That same year, a team of 30 volunteers surveyed a 90 km stretch of the banks of the River Ouse. The surveying has identified an upward trend in population numbers, rising over 60% between 2015 and 2016 to 40,000 individuals. In October 2019 a large mural of a tansy beetle was painted on the side of a house in Queen Street, York by street artist ATM.

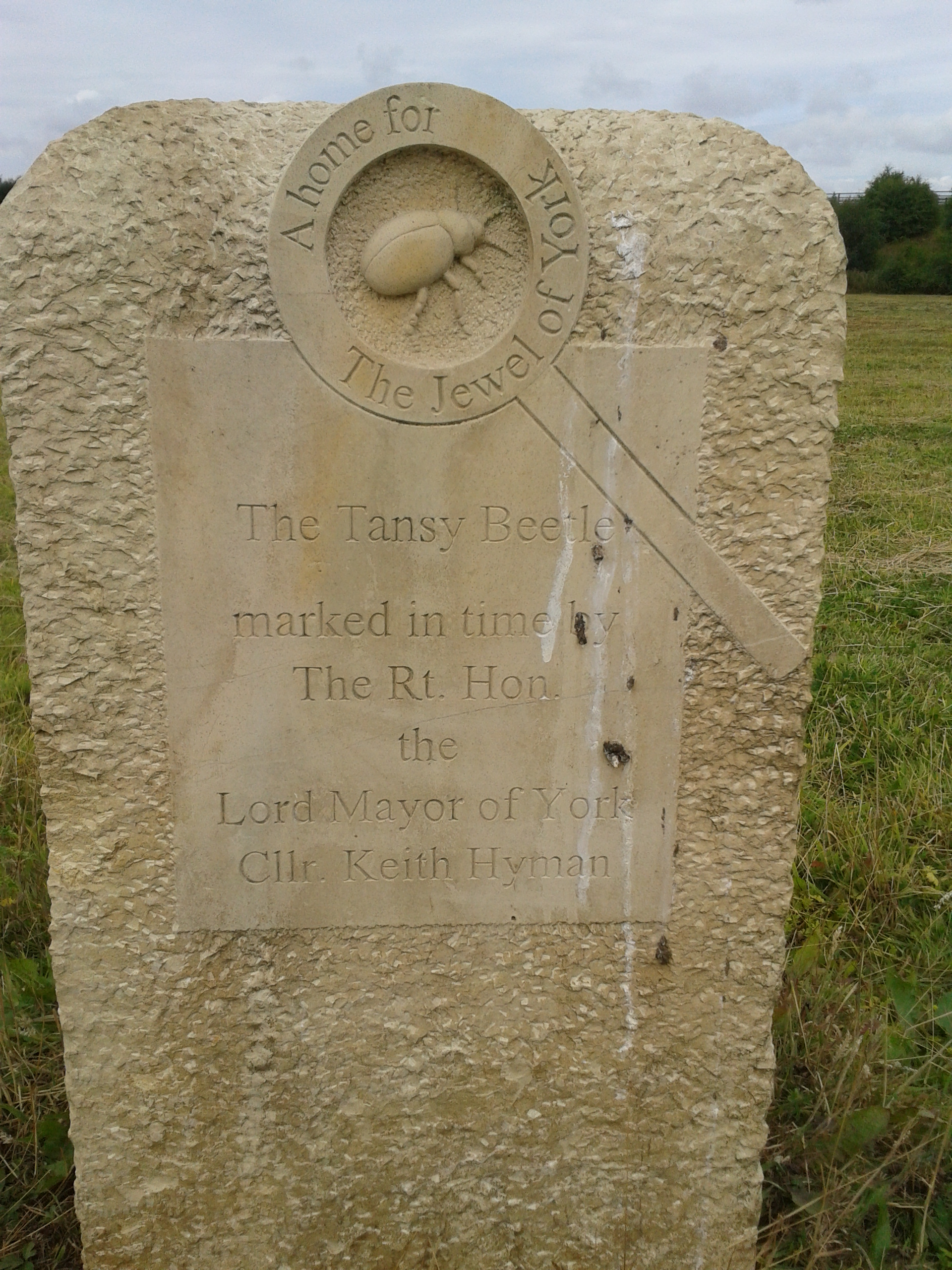
A stone plaque at Fulford Ings to the conservation efforts of the tansy beetle dedicated by the Lord Mayor of York

=== Public reception in York ===
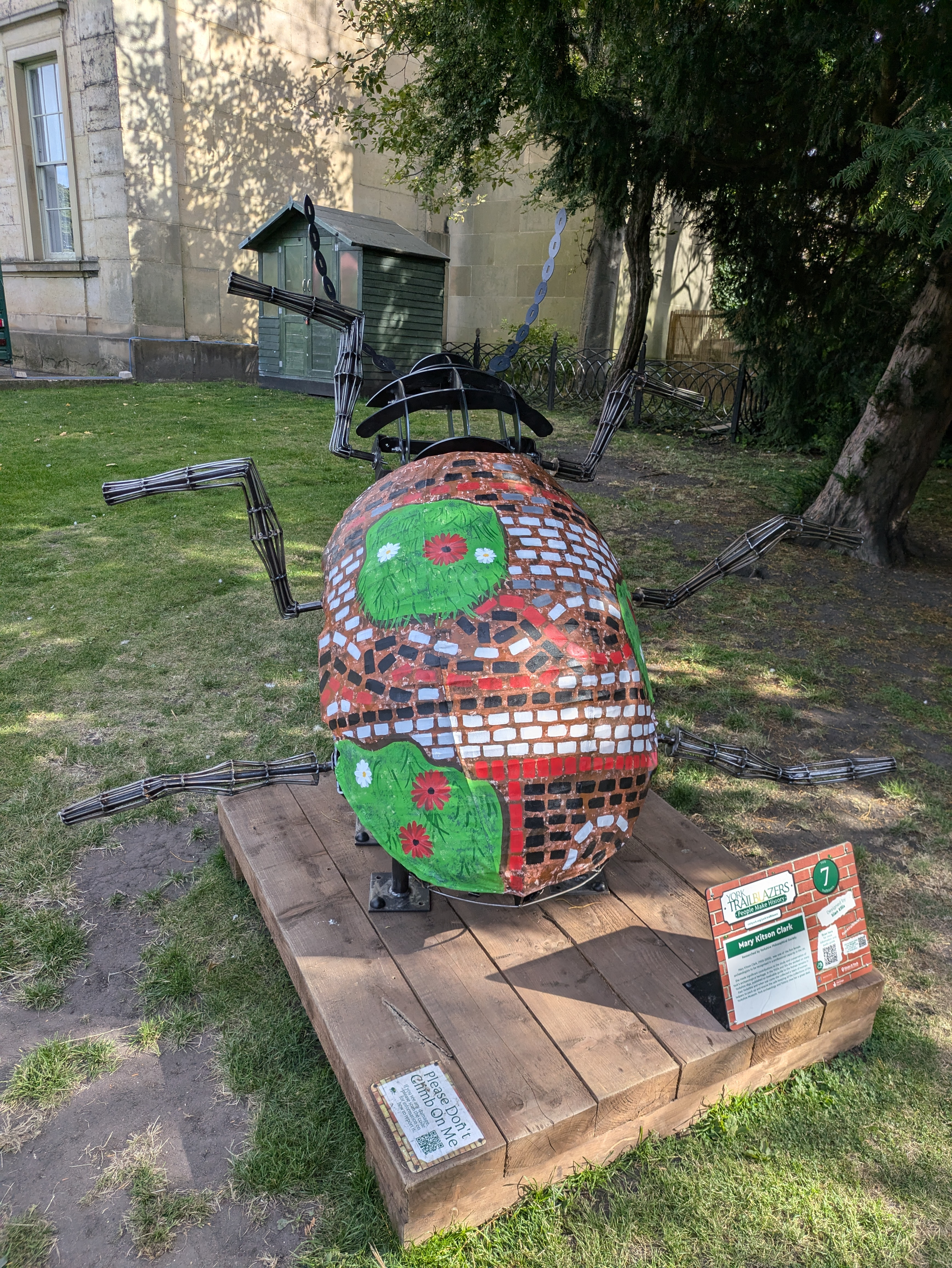
Tansy beetle sculpture commemorating the archaeologist Mary Kitson Clark in the Museum Gardens, York

The Tansy beetle's relationship to York has led to it having a prominent public presence. In January 2022 a large mural depicting a tansy beetle was painted on a building on Queen's Street, York by street artist ATM. In August 2024 a series of 17 metal tansy beetle sculptures were displayed in York and decorated by local artists to highlight historical 'trailblazers' in the city. One of them, featuring the tansy beetle life cycle, can still be seen at St Nick's Nature Reserve & Environment Centre, York.
