= Pachnephorus cristiani =

Scientific classification
- Kingdom: Animalia
- Phylum: Arthropoda
- Clade: Pancrustacea
- Class: Insecta
- Order: Coleoptera
- Suborder: Polyphaga
- Infraorder: Cucujiformia
- Family: Chrysomelidae
- Genus: Pachnephorus
- Subgenus: Pachnephorus (Pachnephorus)
- Species: P. cristiani

Binomial name
- Pachnephorus cristiani Zoia, 2007

Species of beetle

Pachnephorus cristiani is a species of leaf beetle found in the Democratic Republic of the Congo, Angola, Namibia, Botswana, Zimbabwe and Mozambique, described by Stefano Zoia in 2007. It is dedicated to the author's son, Cristian.
