= Pachnephorus danielssoni =

Scientific classification
- Kingdom: Animalia
- Phylum: Arthropoda
- Clade: Pancrustacea
- Class: Insecta
- Order: Coleoptera
- Suborder: Polyphaga
- Infraorder: Cucujiformia
- Family: Chrysomelidae
- Genus: Pachnephorus
- Species: P. danielssoni

Binomial name
- Pachnephorus danielssoni Zoia, 2007

Species of beetle

Pachnephorus danielssoni is a species of leaf beetle found in Sierra Leone, Senegal and the Democratic Republic of the Congo, described by Stefano Zoia in 2007. It is named after Roy Danielsson, who collected and examined material for the species.

== Subspecies ==
There are two subspecies of P. danielssoni:

- Pachnephorus danielssoni danielssoni Zoia, 2007: The nominotypical subspecies. Found in Sierra Leone and Senegal.
- Pachnephorus danielssoni congoanus Zoia, 2007: Found in the Democratic Republic of the Congo. The subspecies name refers to the country where the subspecies was collected.
