= Pachnephorus fasciatus =

Scientific classification
- Kingdom: Animalia
- Phylum: Arthropoda
- Clade: Pancrustacea
- Class: Insecta
- Order: Coleoptera
- Suborder: Polyphaga
- Infraorder: Cucujiformia
- Family: Chrysomelidae
- Genus: Pachnephorus
- Species: P. fasciatus

Binomial name
- Pachnephorus fasciatus Burgeon, 1941

Species of beetle

Pachnephorus fasciatus is a species of leaf beetle found in western, central and southern Africa. It was first described by the Belgian entomologist Louis Burgeon in 1941.

== Subspecies ==
There are two subspecies of P. fasciatus:

- Pachnephorus fasciatus fasciatus Burgeon, 1941: The nominotypical subspecies. Distributed in Cameroon, Central African Republic, Gabon, the Democratic Republic of the Congo and Angola.
- Pachnephorus fasciatus occidentalis Zoia, 2007: Distributed in Senegal, Gambia, Guinea Bissau, Sierra Leone and Nigeria. The subspecies name refers to the subspecies occurring in an occidental (western) region, compared to the area the nominal subspecies is found in.
