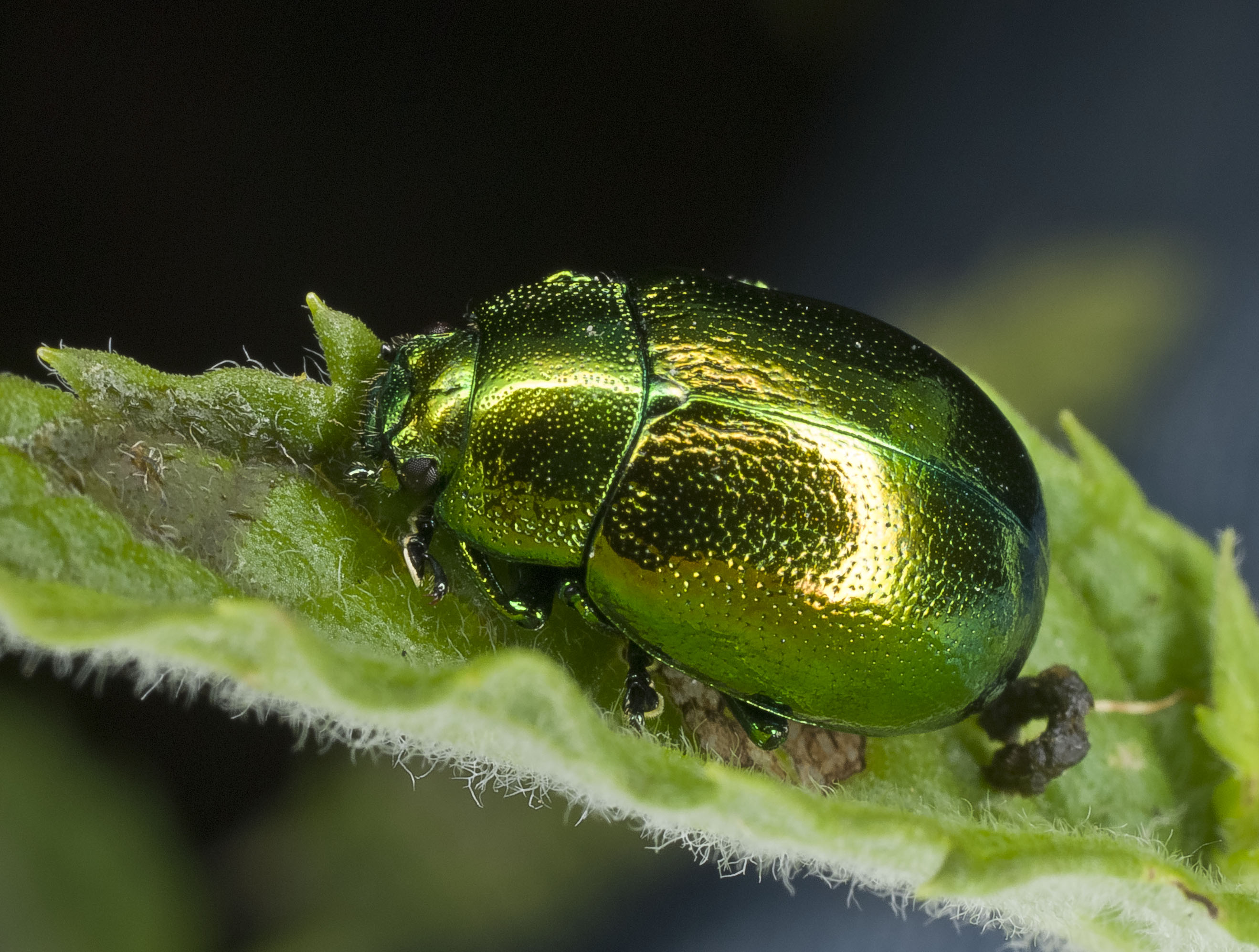

Scientific classification
- Kingdom: Animalia
- Phylum: Arthropoda
- Clade: Pancrustacea
- Class: Insecta
- Order: Coleoptera
- Suborder: Polyphaga
- Infraorder: Cucujiformia
- Family: Chrysomelidae
- Genus: Chrysolina
- Subgenus: Synerga
- Species: C. herbacea

Binomial name
- Chrysolina herbacea (Duftschmid, 1825)

Synonyms
- Chrysomela herbacea Duftschmidt, 1825; Chrysomela menthastri Suffrian, 1851; Chrysomela fulminans Suffrian, 1851

= Chrysolina herbacea =

Species of beetle

Chrysolina herbacea, also known as the mint leaf beetle, or green mint beetle (in the UK), is a species of beetle in the family Chrysomelidae.

== Description ==
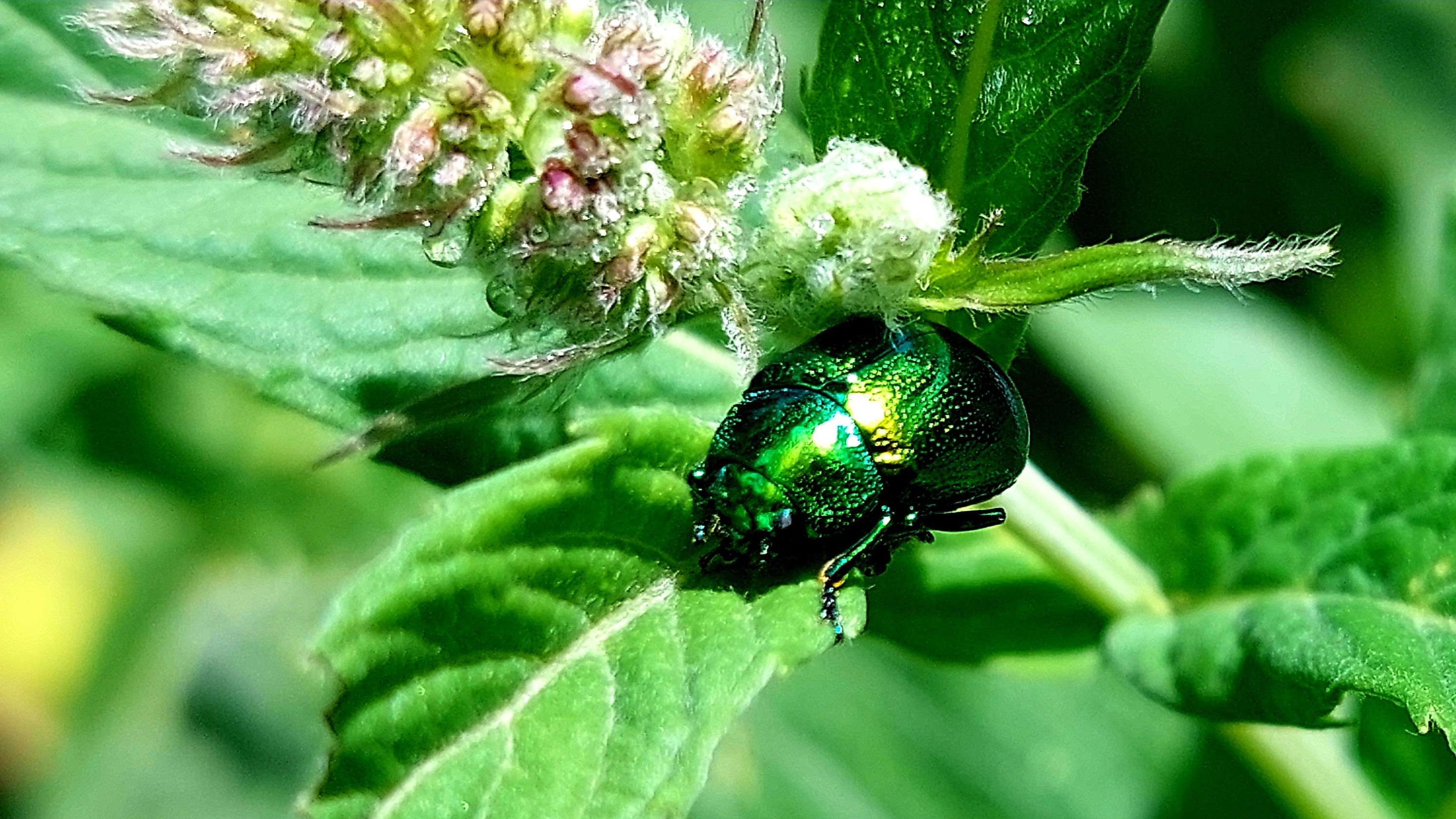
Chrysolina herbacea on a mint leaf

The species is generally metallic bright green, with some of the mint leaf beetles having a gold-purple reflection. Variations in colour exist, with certain specimens, in particular females, ranging from golden-red to deep blue. The beetles' legs and pronotum are the same as their basic colour, and they have antennae.

Chrysolina herbacea is large and has a long, oval shape. The adult beetles can be 8–10 mm long and have black-coloured larvae, which also feed on mint leaves. The adults have complete wings, but they only seldom fly.

Visually, the mint leaf beetle may be confused with the much rarer tansy beetle (Chrysolina graminis), as well as with Cryptocephalus hypochaeridis, and with Chrysolina coerulans.

== Distribution ==
The species can be found in the European islands Great Britain, and Ireland, in European countries such as Portugal, and Romania, as well as in the Caucasus, Turkey, western Central Asia, and North India.

== Habitat ==
The mint leaf beetle prefers to live in damp riverside areas and marshy fields, favouring different wet habitats, as well as in woodland, parkland, and gardens. As host plants, the species prefers several Lamiaceae, particularly mints.

The beetles are active between May and September. In the UK, the adult beetles start appearing in April or May, being prevalent by late May or early June and remaining like this throughout the whole summer.

The adults lay their eggs in May and June, with the larvae hatching in the middle or at the end of June. The larvae feed throughout the summer and then overwinter, once again becoming active and feeding for a short time in April, after which they pupate in the soil.

The adult beetles live long, and they may overwinter up to two times.
