= Scriba (surname) =

Scriba is a surname. Notable people with the surname include:

- Christoph Scriba (1929–2013), German historian of mathematics
- Julius Scriba (1848–1905), German surgeon
- Ludwig Gottlieb Scriba (1736–1804), German theologian and entomologist
