= Pachnephorus moseykoi =

Scientific classification
- Kingdom: Animalia
- Phylum: Arthropoda
- Clade: Pancrustacea
- Class: Insecta
- Order: Coleoptera
- Suborder: Polyphaga
- Infraorder: Cucujiformia
- Family: Chrysomelidae
- Genus: Pachnephorus
- Subgenus: Pachnephorus (Pachnephorus)
- Species: P. moseykoi

Binomial name
- Pachnephorus moseykoi Zoia, 2007

Species of beetle

Pachnephorus moseykoi is a species of leaf beetle that is widely distributed in sub-Saharan Africa, described by Stefano Zoia in 2007. It is named after Alexey G. Moseyko, a specialist in Eumolpinae (a subfamily of Chrysomelidae).

== Distribution ==
P. moseykoi is recorded from Senegal, Gambia, Guinea Bissau, Sierra Leone, Mali, Ghana, the Republic of the Congo, Sudan and Ethiopia.
