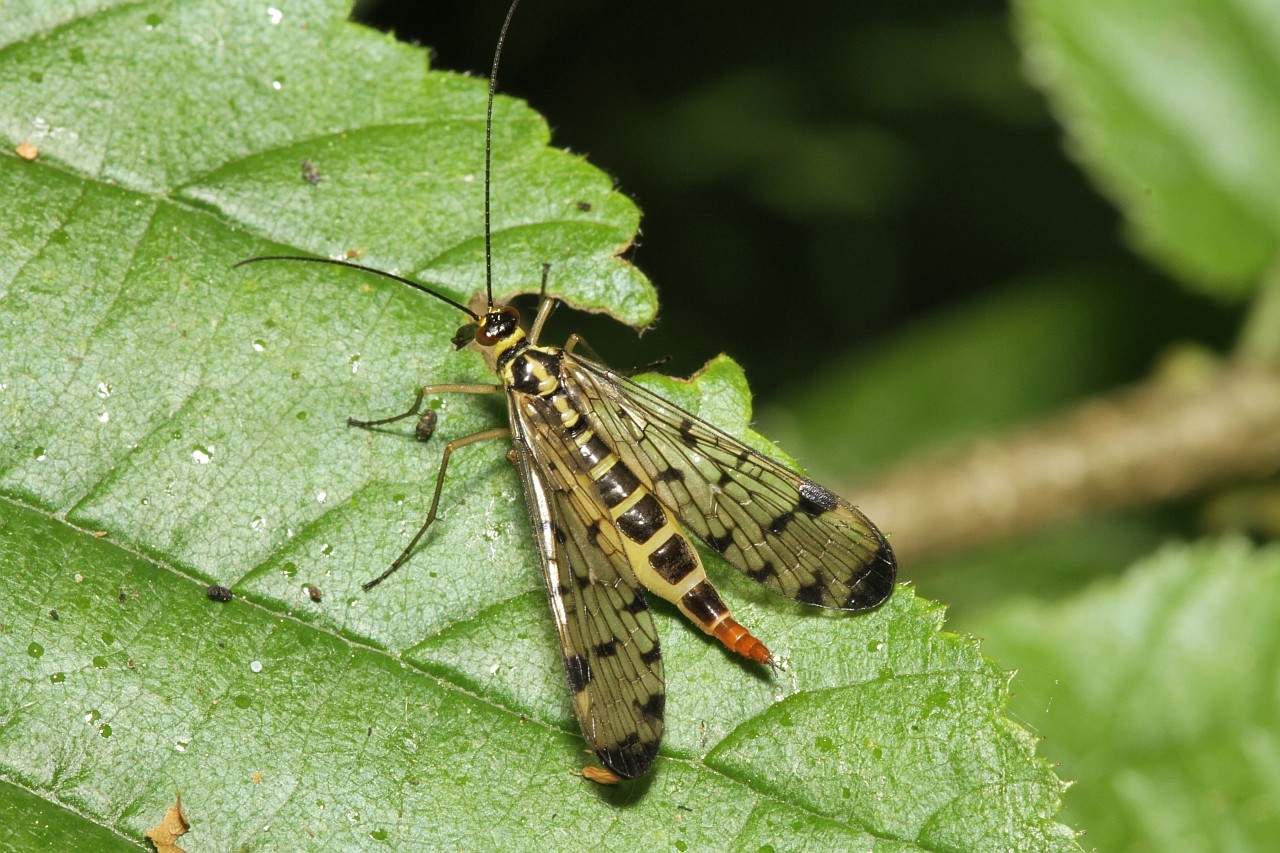

Scientific classification
- Kingdom: Animalia
- Phylum: Arthropoda
- Clade: Pancrustacea
- Class: Insecta
- Order: Mecoptera
- Family: Panorpidae
- Genus: Panorpa
- Species: P. germanica

Binomial name
- Panorpa germanica Linnaeus, 1758

= Panorpa germanica =

Species of insect

Panorpa germanica, also known by its common name German scorpionfly, is a species from the genus Panorpa.
