= Ludwig Gottlieb Scriba =

German theologian and entomologist

Ludwig Gottlieb Scriba (3 June 1736 – 3 May 1804) was a German theologian and entomologist. Ludwig Gottlieb Scriba was the editor of Journal für die Liebhaber der Entomologie (1790–1791) which contains descriptions of new species. Only three volumes of this work were published. He is not to be confused with Wilhelm Georg Heinrich Scriba or Christoph Philipp Heinrich Scriba, also entomologists.
