= Caspar Erasmus Duftschmid =

Austrian naturalist and physician

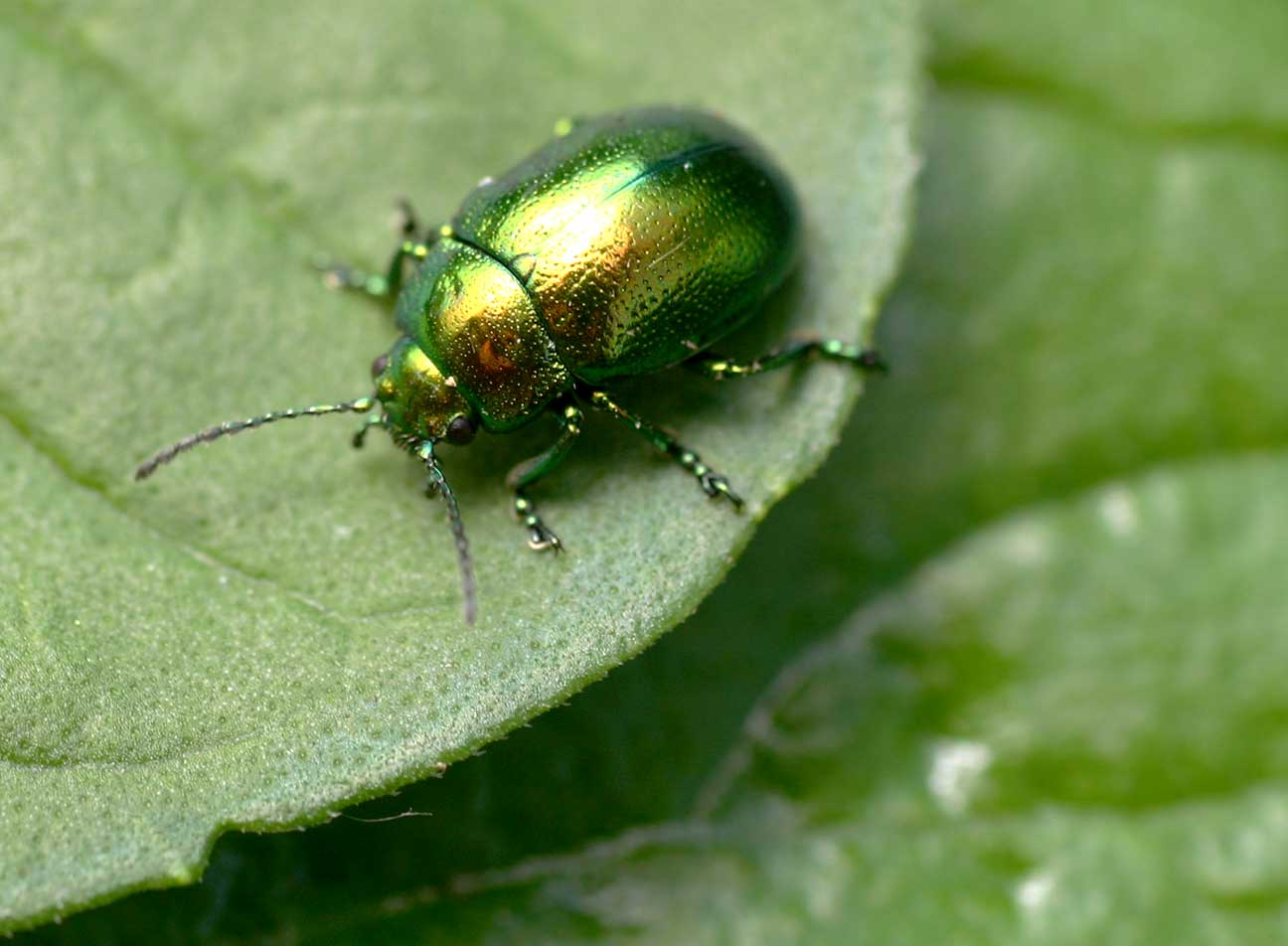
Chrysolina herbacea, a beetle described by Duftschmid

Caspar (or Kaspar) Erasmus Duftschmid was an Austrian naturalist and physician who made significant contributions to entomology, especially Coleoptera.

He was born in Gmunden on 19 November 1767, and died in Linz on 17 December 1821.

His best-known work, introducing many new genera and species is Fauna Austriaca. Oder Beschreibung der österreischischen Insekten für angehande Freunde der Entomologie, which was published in three volumes (in 1805, 1812, and 1825) at Linz and Leipzig. His collection of Coleoptera and Lepidoptera from Upper Austria is in Oberösterreiches Landesmuseum – Biologiezentrum (The natural history museum of Upper Austria) in Linz. The labels are lost, and the insects incorporated into the general collection.
