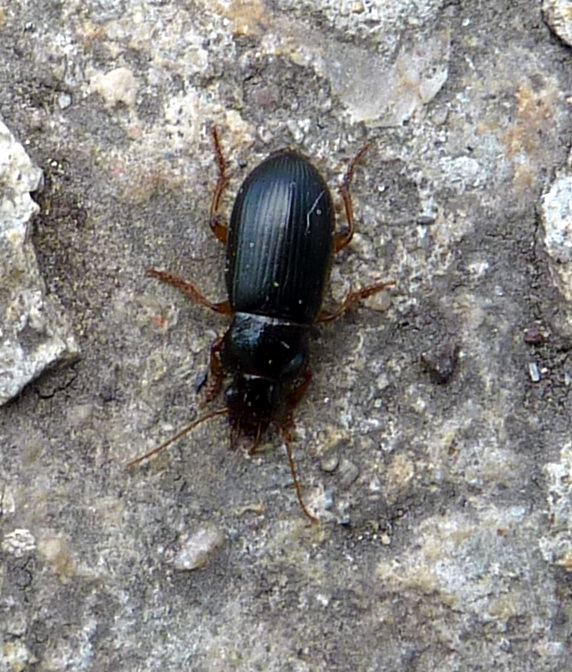

Scientific classification
- Kingdom: Animalia
- Phylum: Arthropoda
- Class: Insecta
- Order: Coleoptera
- Suborder: Adephaga
- Family: Carabidae
- Genus: Harpalus
- Species: H. latus

Binomial name
- Harpalus latus (Linnaeus, 1758)

Synonyms
- Harpalus acuminatus Stephens, 1835; Harpalus flaviventris Sturm, 1818; Harpalus fulvipes Fabricius, 1792; Harpalus lateralis Stephens, 1835; Carabus limbatus Duftschmid, 1812; Harpalus metallescens Rye, 1874; Harpalus perversus Roubal, 1917; Harpalus ruficeps Curtis, 1833; Harpalus rugulosus Heer, 1837; Carabus surinamensis Fabrcius, 1792

= Harpalus latus =

Species of beetle

Harpalus latus is a ground beetle in the subfamily Harpalinae that can be found in Europe, Armenia, Georgia, Kazakhstan, Mongolia, and North Korea. Found in Ontario Canada

== Description ==
The species is 10.2 millimetres (0.40 in) in length. Its anal tube is twice as long as its cerci, approximately 0.65–0.7 millimetres (0.026–0.028 in). Its head is 1.5 millimetres (0.059 in) long and broad. It has forwardly extending cervical grooves which are long too. The species nasal is similar to Harpalus rufipes, but it differs in the number of teeth which are crenellated on the median part. The second segment of antenna have 2 setae while it has none on the first one. Its tergum have 4 and 6 setae which appear in transverse rows. It has 2 teeth in front of retinaculum which are directed inward. It also has 4 large teeth on the first instar egg-bursters. Both antennas and pedipalp are rufous and ferruginous.

== Distribution ==
In Great Britain, it can be found in Bidston Hill and Heswall Heath. In 1901 it was recorded from Valentia island.

== Habitat ==
Its natural habitat is forests, heath sand and gravel-pits.
