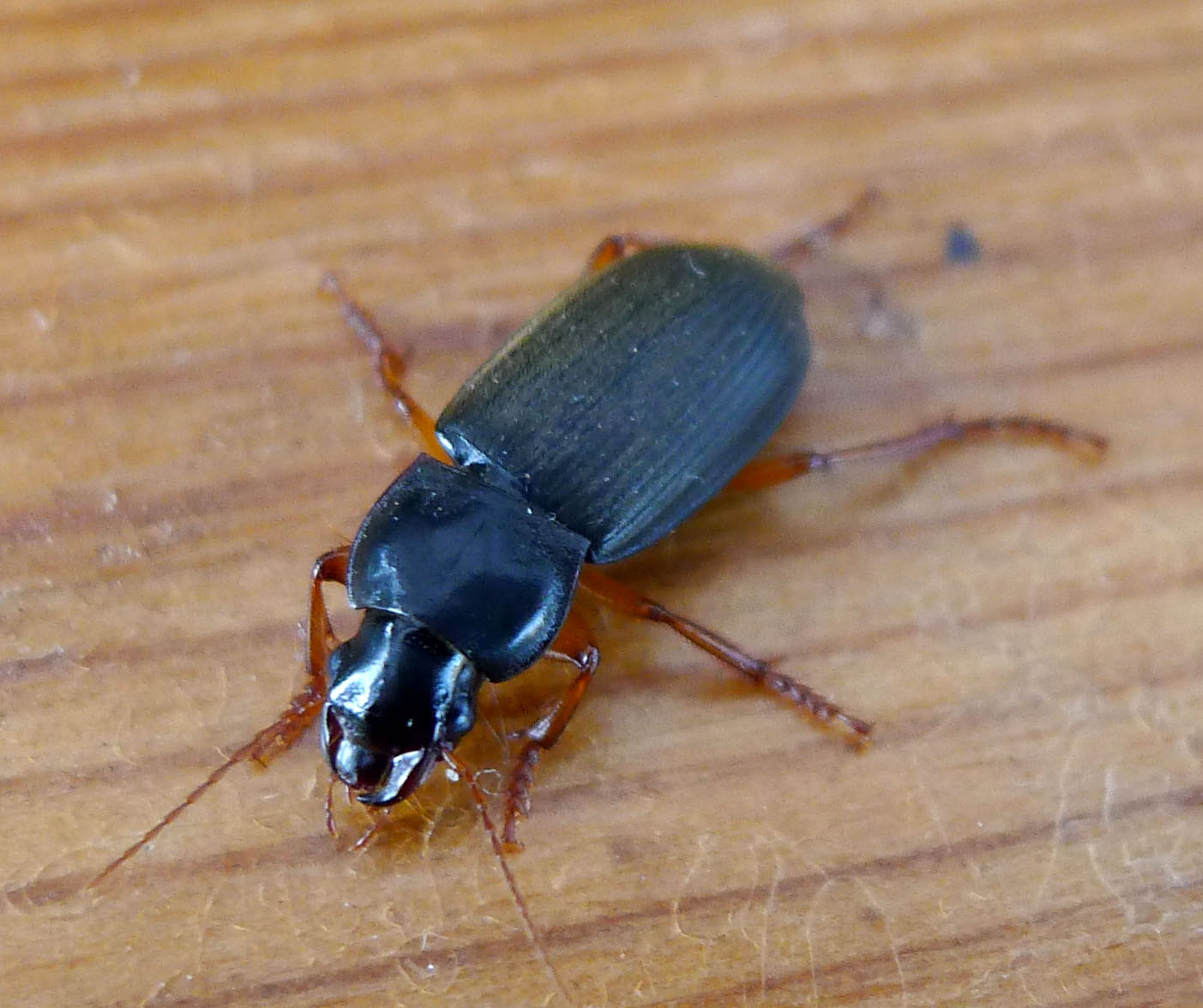

Scientific classification
- Kingdom: Animalia
- Phylum: Arthropoda
- Clade: Pancrustacea
- Class: Insecta
- Order: Coleoptera
- Suborder: Adephaga
- Family: Carabidae
- Genus: Harpalus
- Species: H. rufipes

Binomial name
- Harpalus rufipes (Degeer, 1774)

= Harpalus rufipes =

Strawberry seed beetle

Species of beetle

Harpalus rufipes, commonly known as the strawberry seed beetle, is a species of ground beetle in the subfamily Harpalinae. It was described by Degeer in 1774, with the epithet rufipes being derived from Latin for red-footed. Harpalus rufipes is native to Europe.

As a predator, Harpalus rufipes is used as a biological agent to control seed-eating pests including aphids and slugs such as Deroceras reticulatum, though they are known to feed on the seeds of strawberries. It has been used as a model organism to investigate the immune system of beetles, and a study has shown it is sensitive to engine oil and diesel oil.
