= Harpalus gravis =

Scientific classification
- Kingdom: Animalia
- Phylum: Arthropoda
- Class: Insecta
- Order: Coleoptera
- Suborder: Adephaga
- Family: Carabidae
- Genus: Harpalus
- Species: H. gravis

Binomial name
- Harpalus gravis LeConte, 1858

Species of beetle

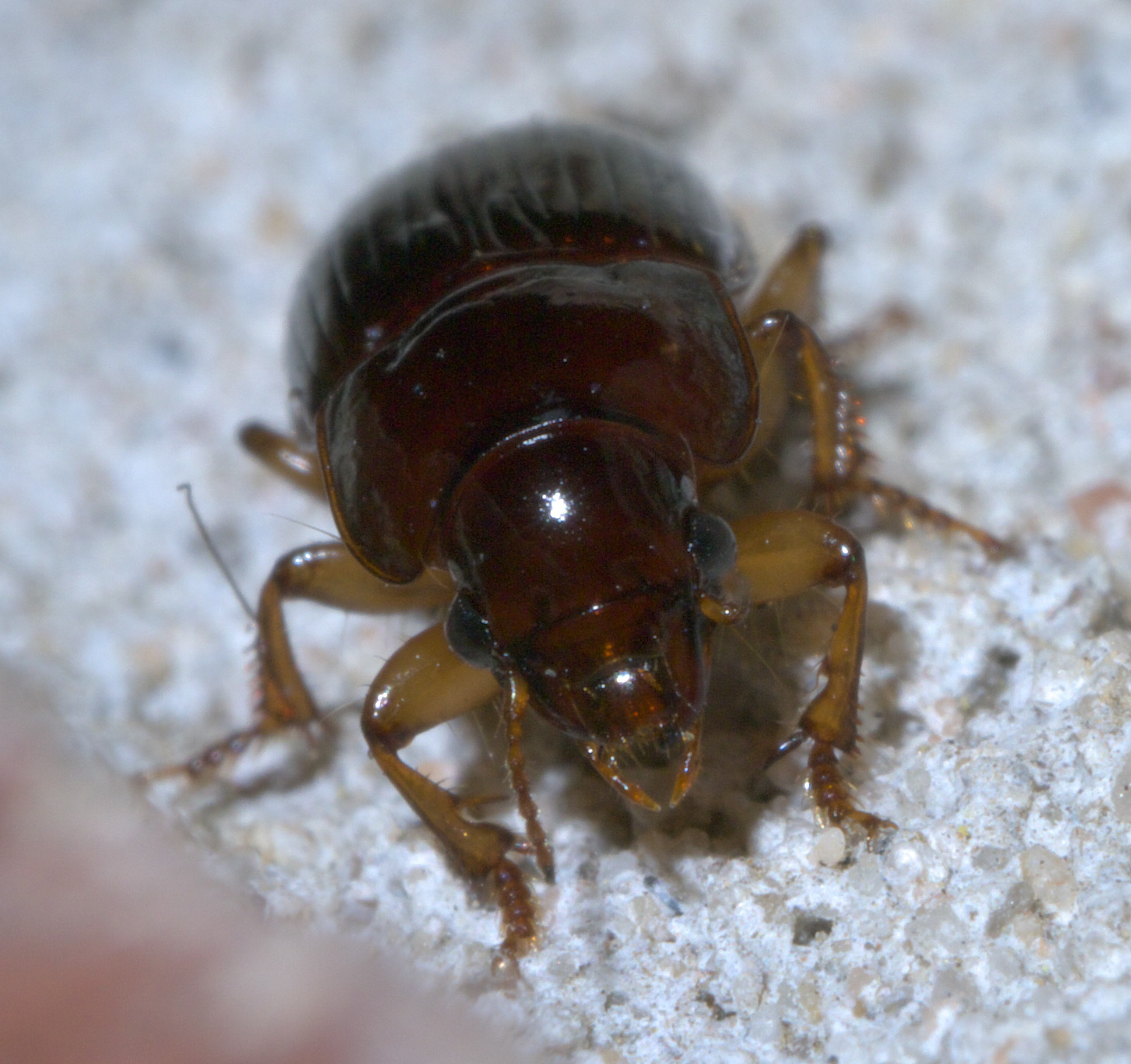
Harpalus gravis

Harpalus gravis is a species of ground beetle in the subfamily Harpalinae. It was described by John Lawrence LeConte in 1858.
