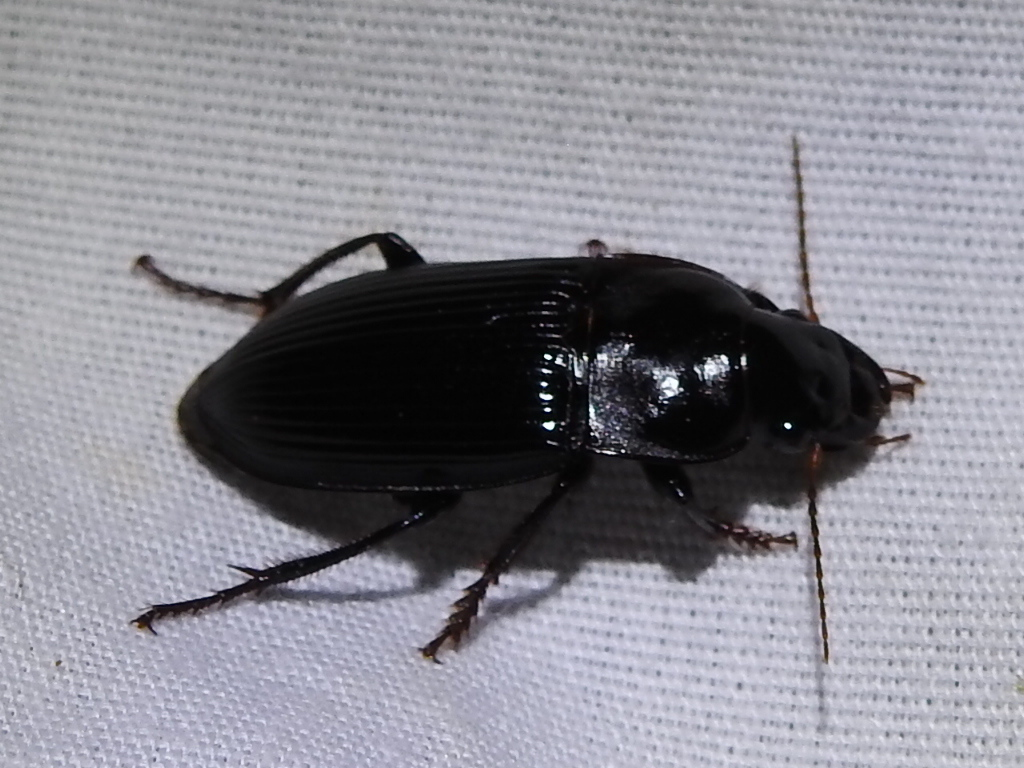

Scientific classification
- Kingdom: Animalia
- Phylum: Arthropoda
- Class: Insecta
- Order: Coleoptera
- Suborder: Adephaga
- Family: Carabidae
- Genus: Harpalus
- Species: H. katiae

Binomial name
- Harpalus katiae F.Battoni, 1985

= Harpalus katiae =

Species of beetle

Harpalus katiae is a species of ground beetle in the subfamily Harpalinae. It was described by F.Battoni in 1985.
