= Harpalus salinus klementzae =

Scientific classification
- Kingdom: Animalia
- Phylum: Arthropoda
- Class: Insecta
- Order: Coleoptera
- Suborder: Adephaga
- Family: Carabidae
- Genus: Harpalus
- Species: H. salinus
- Subspecies: H. s. klementzae

Trinomial name
- Harpalus salinus klementzae Kataev, 1984

Subspecies of beetle

Harpalus salinus klementzae is a subspecies of ground beetle native to Central Asia, where it could be found in such countries as Mongolia, Chinese province of Xinjiang, and Russian autonomous regions such as Buryat Republic, Chita, Irkutsk, and Maritime Province.
