= Harpalus salinus =

Scientific classification
- Kingdom: Animalia
- Phylum: Arthropoda
- Class: Insecta
- Order: Coleoptera
- Suborder: Adephaga
- Family: Carabidae
- Genus: Harpalus
- Species: H. salinus

Binomial name
- Harpalus salinus (Dejean, 1829)

Species of beetle

Harpalus salinus is a species of ground beetle native to Europe, where it can be found in Ukraine and southern part of Russia. It is also found in such Asian countries as Afghanistan, Kazakhstan, Kyrgyzstan, Tajikistan, Indian province Kashmir, and Chinese ones such as Xinjiang, and Tibet.

== Subspecies ==
It has 3 subspecies:

- Harpalus salinus agonus Tschitscherine, 1894
- Harpalus salinus klementzae Kataev, 1984
- Harpalus salinus salinus
