= Harpalus salinus agonus =

Scientific classification
- Kingdom: Animalia
- Phylum: Arthropoda
- Class: Insecta
- Order: Coleoptera
- Suborder: Adephaga
- Family: Carabidae
- Genus: Harpalus
- Species: H. salinus
- Subspecies: H. s. agonus

Trinomial name
- Harpalus salinus agonus Tschitscherine, 1894)

Synonyms
- Harpalus salinus ellipticus (Bates, 1878) [nec Ballion, 1878]

Subspecies of beetle

Harpalus salinus agonus is a subspecies of ground beetle native to Central Asia, where it could be found in such countries as Afghanistan, Kyrgyzstan, Tajikistan, Indian province Kashmir, and Chinese ones such as Xinjiang, and Tibet.
