= Harpalus stevensi =

Scientific classification
- Kingdom: Animalia
- Phylum: Arthropoda
- Class: Insecta
- Order: Coleoptera
- Suborder: Adephaga
- Family: Carabidae
- Genus: Harpalus
- Species: H. stevensi

Binomial name
- Harpalus stevensi Kataev, 2011

Species of beetle

Harpalus stevensi is a species of ground beetle in the subfamily Harpalinae. It was described by Kataev in 2011. Two new species of the genus Harpalus Latreille, 1802 were described: H. stevensi from China (Sichuan) and H. dudkoi from Turkey (Adana). Both species belong to the nominotypical subgenus and are included in the tardus species-group.

== See also ==
- List of Harpalus species
