= Harpalus dudkoi =

Scientific classification
- Kingdom: Animalia
- Phylum: Arthropoda
- Class: Insecta
- Order: Coleoptera
- Suborder: Adephaga
- Family: Carabidae
- Genus: Harpalus
- Species: H. dudkoi

Binomial name
- Harpalus dudkoi Kataev, 2011

Species of beetle

Harpalus dudkoi is a species of ground beetle in the subfamily Harpalinae. It was described by Boris Mikhailovich Kataev in 2011.
