= Harpalus caspius =

Scientific classification
- Kingdom: Animalia
- Phylum: Arthropoda
- Clade: Pancrustacea
- Class: Insecta
- Order: Coleoptera
- Suborder: Adephaga
- Family: Carabidae
- Genus: Harpalus
- Species: H. caspius

Binomial name
- Harpalus caspius (Steven, 1806)

Synonyms
- Harpalus pseudodimidiatus Schauberger, 1928; Harpalus roubali Schauberger, 1928

Species of beetle

Harpalus caspius is a species of black coloured ground beetle that can be found in the Near East and the Palearctic realm. In Europe, it can be found in such countries as Austria, Bulgaria, Czech Republic, Germany, Hungary, Moldova, Poland, Romania, Slovakia, Ukraine, all states of former Yugoslavia (except for Bosnia and Herzegovina and North Macedonia), and southern part of Russia. It is also found in such Eurasian countries as Armenia, Azerbaijan, Georgia and Turkey. It is 13 millimetres (0.51 in) in length.
