= Harpalus lewisii =

Conservation status
- Secure (NatureServe)

Scientific classification
- Kingdom: Animalia
- Phylum: Arthropoda
- Class: Insecta
- Order: Coleoptera
- Suborder: Adephaga
- Family: Carabidae
- Genus: Harpalus
- Species: H. lewisii

Binomial name
- Harpalus lewisii LeConte, 1865

Synonyms
- Harpalus aesopus Casey, 1914

Species of beetle

Harpalus lewisii, also known as Lewis' harpaline beetle, is a species of ground beetle in the subfamily Harpalinae. It was described by John Lawrence LeConte in 1865. It is found in the northeastern North America in both Canada and the United States.

Harpalus lewisii measure about 11–15 mm (0.43–0.59 in).
