= Harpalus fuscipalpis =

- Illustration by Sturm showing Harpalus fuscipalpis (B, top right)

Scientific classification
- Kingdom: Animalia
- Phylum: Arthropoda
- Clade: Pancrustacea
- Class: Insecta
- Order: Coleoptera
- Suborder: Adephaga
- Family: Carabidae
- Genus: Harpalus
- Species: H. fuscipalpis

Binomial name
- Harpalus fuscipalpis Sturm, 1818

Species of beetle

Harpalus fuscipalpis is a species of ground beetle in the subfamily Harpalinae. It was described by Sturm in 1818.
