= Harpalus kagyzmanicus =

Scientific classification
- Kingdom: Animalia
- Phylum: Arthropoda
- Class: Insecta
- Order: Coleoptera
- Suborder: Adephaga
- Family: Carabidae
- Genus: Harpalus
- Species: H. kagyzmanicus

Binomial name
- Harpalus kagyzmanicus Kataev, 1984

Species of beetle

Harpalus kagyzmanicus is a species of ground beetle in the subfamily Harpalinae. It was described by Boris Mikhailovich Kataev in 1984.

== Distribution ==
Its known distribution is in Turkey.
