= Harpalus cordatus =

Scientific classification
- Kingdom: Animalia
- Phylum: Arthropoda
- Class: Insecta
- Order: Coleoptera
- Suborder: Adephaga
- Family: Carabidae
- Subfamily: Harpalinae
- Tribe: Harpalini
- Genus: Harpalus
- Species: H. cordatus

Binomial name
- Harpalus cordatus (LeConte, 1853)

Synonyms
- Harpalus tadorcus

Species of beetle

Harpalus cordatus is a species in the beetle family Carabidae. It is found in the United States.
