= Harpalus disimuciulus =

Scientific classification
- Kingdom: Animalia
- Phylum: Arthropoda
- Class: Insecta
- Order: Coleoptera
- Suborder: Adephaga
- Family: Carabidae
- Genus: Harpalus
- Species: H. disimuciulus

Binomial name
- Harpalus disimuciulus Huang, Lei, Yan & Hu, 1996

Species of beetle

Harpalus disimuciulus is a species of ground beetle in the subfamily Harpalinae. It was described by Huang, Lei, Yan & Hu in 1996.
