= Harpalus ganssuensis =

Scientific classification
- Kingdom: Animalia
- Phylum: Arthropoda
- Class: Insecta
- Order: Coleoptera
- Suborder: Adephaga
- Family: Carabidae
- Subfamily: Harpalinae
- Tribe: Harpalini
- Genus: Harpalus
- Species: H. ganssuensis

Binomial name
- Harpalus ganssuensis Semenov, 1889

Species of beetle

Harpalus ganssuensis is a species in the beetle family Carabidae. It is found in China.
