= Harpalus inconcinnus =

Scientific classification
- Kingdom: Animalia
- Phylum: Arthropoda
- Class: Insecta
- Order: Coleoptera
- Suborder: Adephaga
- Family: Carabidae
- Genus: Harpalus
- Species: H. inconcinnus

Binomial name
- Harpalus inconcinnus Chaudoir, 1876

Species of beetle

Harpalus inconcinnus is a species of ground beetle in the subfamily Harpalinae. It was described by Maximilien Chaudoir in 1876.
