= Harpalus puncticeps =

Scientific classification
- Kingdom: Animalia
- Phylum: Arthropoda
- Class: Insecta
- Order: Coleoptera
- Suborder: Adephaga
- Family: Carabidae
- Genus: Harpalus
- Species: H. puncticeps

Binomial name
- Harpalus puncticeps (Casey, 1914)

Species of beetle

Harpalus puncticeps is a species of ground beetle in the subfamily Harpalinae. It was described by Thomas Lincoln Casey Jr. in 1914.
