= Harpalus kirgisicus =

Scientific classification
- Kingdom: Animalia
- Phylum: Arthropoda
- Class: Insecta
- Order: Coleoptera
- Suborder: Adephaga
- Family: Carabidae
- Genus: Harpalus
- Species: H. kirgisicus

Binomial name
- Harpalus kirgisicus Motschulsky, 1844

Species of beetle

Harpalus kirgisicus is a species of ground beetle in the subfamily Harpalinae. It was described by Victor Motschulsky in 1844.
