= Harpalus pallidipennis =

Scientific classification
- Kingdom: Animalia
- Phylum: Arthropoda
- Class: Insecta
- Order: Coleoptera
- Suborder: Adephaga
- Family: Carabidae
- Genus: Harpalus
- Species: H. pallidipennis

Binomial name
- Harpalus pallidipennis A. Morawitz, 1862

Species of beetle

Harpalus pallidipennis is a species of ground beetle in the subfamily Harpalinae. It was described by A. Morawitz in 1862.
