= Harpalus pseudophonoides =

Scientific classification
- Kingdom: Animalia
- Phylum: Arthropoda
- Class: Insecta
- Order: Coleoptera
- Suborder: Adephaga
- Family: Carabidae
- Genus: Harpalus
- Species: H. pseudophonoides

Binomial name
- Harpalus pseudophonoides Schauberger, 1930

Species of beetle

Harpalus pseudophonoides is a species of ground beetle in the subfamily Harpalinae. It was described by Schauberger in 1930.
