= Harpalus kandaharensis =

Scientific classification
- Kingdom: Animalia
- Phylum: Arthropoda
- Class: Insecta
- Order: Coleoptera
- Suborder: Adephaga
- Family: Carabidae
- Genus: Harpalus
- Species: H. kandaharensis

Binomial name
- Harpalus kandaharensis Jedlicka, 1956

Species of beetle

Harpalus kandaharensis is a species of ground beetle in the subfamily Harpalinae. It was described by Jedlicka in 1956.
