= Harpalus lopezi =

Scientific classification
- Kingdom: Animalia
- Phylum: Arthropoda
- Class: Insecta
- Order: Coleoptera
- Suborder: Adephaga
- Family: Carabidae
- Genus: Harpalus
- Species: H. lopezi

Binomial name
- Harpalus lopezi Serrano & Lencina, 2008

Species of beetle

Harpalus lopezi is a species of ground beetle in the subfamily Harpalinae. It was described by Serrano & Lencina in 2008.
