= Harpalus rumelicus =

Scientific classification
- Kingdom: Animalia
- Phylum: Arthropoda
- Class: Insecta
- Order: Coleoptera
- Suborder: Adephaga
- Family: Carabidae
- Genus: Harpalus
- Species: H. rumelicus

Binomial name
- Harpalus rumelicus Apfelbeck, 1904

Species of beetle

Harpalus rumelicus is a species of ground beetle in the subfamily Harpalinae. It was described by Apfelbeck in 1904.
