= Harpalus klapperichi =

Scientific classification
- Kingdom: Animalia
- Phylum: Arthropoda
- Class: Insecta
- Order: Coleoptera
- Suborder: Adephaga
- Family: Carabidae
- Genus: Harpalus
- Species: H. klapperichi

Binomial name
- Harpalus klapperichi Jedlicka, 1956

Species of beetle

Harpalus klapperichi is a species of ground beetle in the subfamily Harpalinae. It was described by Jedlicka in 1956.
