= Harpalus gregoryi =

Scientific classification
- Kingdom: Animalia
- Phylum: Arthropoda
- Class: Insecta
- Order: Coleoptera
- Suborder: Adephaga
- Family: Carabidae
- Genus: Harpalus
- Species: H. gregoryi

Binomial name
- Harpalus gregoryi Alluaud, 1917

Species of beetle

Harpalus gregoryi is a species of ground beetle in the subfamily Harpalinae. It was described by Alluaud in 1917.
