= Harpalus laticeps =

Scientific classification
- Kingdom: Animalia
- Phylum: Arthropoda
- Class: Insecta
- Order: Coleoptera
- Suborder: Adephaga
- Family: Carabidae
- Genus: Harpalus
- Species: H. laticeps

Binomial name
- Harpalus laticeps LeConte, 1850

Species of beetle

Harpalus laticeps is a species of ground beetle in the subfamily Harpalinae. It was described by John Lawrence LeConte in 1850.
