= Harpalus michaili =

Scientific classification
- Kingdom: Animalia
- Phylum: Arthropoda
- Class: Insecta
- Order: Coleoptera
- Suborder: Adephaga
- Family: Carabidae
- Genus: Harpalus
- Species: H. michaili

Binomial name
- Harpalus michaili Kataev, 1990

Species of beetle

Harpalus michaili is a species of ground beetle in the subfamily Harpalinae. It was described by Boris Mikhailovich Kataev in 1990.
