= Harpalus chasanensis =

Scientific classification
- Kingdom: Animalia
- Phylum: Arthropoda
- Class: Insecta
- Order: Coleoptera
- Suborder: Adephaga
- Family: Carabidae
- Genus: Harpalus
- Species: H. chasanensis

Binomial name
- Harpalus chasanensis Lafer, 1989

Species of beetle

Harpalus chasanensis is a species of ground beetle in the subfamily Harpalinae. It was described by Lafer in 1989.
