= Harpalus ebeninus =

Scientific classification
- Kingdom: Animalia
- Phylum: Arthropoda
- Class: Insecta
- Order: Coleoptera
- Suborder: Adephaga
- Family: Carabidae
- Genus: Harpalus
- Species: H. ebeninus

Binomial name
- Harpalus ebeninus Heyden, 1870

Species of beetle

Harpalus ebeninus is a species of ground beetle in the subfamily Harpalinae. It was described by Heyden in 1870.
