= Harpalus kunarensis =

Scientific classification
- Kingdom: Animalia
- Phylum: Arthropoda
- Class: Insecta
- Order: Coleoptera
- Suborder: Adephaga
- Family: Carabidae
- Genus: Harpalus
- Species: H. kunarensis

Binomial name
- Harpalus kunarensis Kataev, 1993

Species of beetle

Harpalus kunarensis is a species of ground beetle in the subfamily Harpalinae. It was described by Kataev in 1993.
