= Harpalus lethierryi =

Scientific classification
- Kingdom: Animalia
- Phylum: Arthropoda
- Class: Insecta
- Order: Coleoptera
- Suborder: Adephaga
- Family: Carabidae
- Genus: Harpalus
- Species: H. lethierryi

Binomial name
- Harpalus lethierryi Reiche, 1860

Species of beetle

Harpalus lethierryi is a species of ground beetle in the subfamily Harpalinae. It was described by Reiche in 1860.
