= Harpalus melaneus =

Scientific classification
- Kingdom: Animalia
- Phylum: Arthropoda
- Class: Insecta
- Order: Coleoptera
- Suborder: Adephaga
- Family: Carabidae
- Genus: Harpalus
- Species: H. melaneus

Binomial name
- Harpalus melaneus Bates, 1878

Species of beetle

Harpalus melaneus is a species of ground beetle in the subfamily Harpalinae. It was described by Henry Walter Bates in 1878.
