= Harpalus araraticus =

Scientific classification
- Kingdom: Animalia
- Phylum: Arthropoda
- Class: Insecta
- Order: Coleoptera
- Suborder: Adephaga
- Family: Carabidae
- Genus: Harpalus
- Species: H. araraticus

Binomial name
- Harpalus araraticus Mylnar, 1979

Species of beetle

Harpalus araraticus is a species of ground beetle in the subfamily Harpalinae. It was described by Mylnar in 1979.
