= Harpalus retractus =

Scientific classification
- Kingdom: Animalia
- Phylum: Arthropoda
- Class: Insecta
- Order: Coleoptera
- Suborder: Adephaga
- Family: Carabidae
- Genus: Harpalus
- Species: H. retractus

Binomial name
- Harpalus retractus LeConte, 1863

Species of insect

Harpalus retractus is a species of ground beetle in the subfamily Harpalinae. It was described by John Lawrence LeConte in 1863.
