= Harpalus basuto =

Scientific classification
- Kingdom: Animalia
- Phylum: Arthropoda
- Class: Insecta
- Order: Coleoptera
- Suborder: Adephaga
- Family: Carabidae
- Genus: Harpalus
- Species: H. basuto

Binomial name
- Harpalus basuto Basilewsky, 1958

Species of beetle

Harpalus basuto is a species of ground beetle in the subfamily Harpalinae. It was described by Basilewsky in 1958.
