= Harpalus somereni =

Scientific classification
- Kingdom: Animalia
- Phylum: Arthropoda
- Class: Insecta
- Order: Coleoptera
- Suborder: Adephaga
- Family: Carabidae
- Genus: Harpalus
- Species: H. somereni

Binomial name
- Harpalus somereni Basilewsky, 1946

Species of beetle

Harpalus somereni is a species of ground beetle in the subfamily Harpalinae. It was described by Basilewsky in 1946.
