= Harpalus convexus =

Scientific classification
- Kingdom: Animalia
- Phylum: Arthropoda
- Class: Insecta
- Order: Coleoptera
- Suborder: Adephaga
- Family: Carabidae
- Genus: Harpalus
- Species: H. convexus

Binomial name
- Harpalus convexus Faldermann, 1836

Species of beetle

Harpalus convexus is a species of ground beetle in the subfamily Harpalinae. It was described by Faldermann in 1836.
