= Harpalus massarti =

Scientific classification
- Kingdom: Animalia
- Phylum: Arthropoda
- Class: Insecta
- Order: Coleoptera
- Suborder: Adephaga
- Family: Carabidae
- Genus: Harpalus
- Species: H. massarti

Binomial name
- Harpalus massarti Burgeon, 1935

Species of beetle

Harpalus massarti is a species of ground beetle in the subfamily Harpalinae. It was described by Burgeon in 1935.
