= Harpalus balli =

Scientific classification
- Kingdom: Animalia
- Phylum: Arthropoda
- Class: Insecta
- Order: Coleoptera
- Suborder: Adephaga
- Family: Carabidae
- Genus: Harpalus
- Species: H. balli

Binomial name
- Harpalus balli Noonan, 1991

Species of beetle

Harpalus balli is a species of ground beetle in the subfamily Harpalinae. It was described by Noonan in 1991.
