= Harpalus italus =

Scientific classification
- Kingdom: Animalia
- Phylum: Arthropoda
- Class: Insecta
- Order: Coleoptera
- Suborder: Adephaga
- Family: Carabidae
- Genus: Harpalus
- Species: H. italus

Binomial name
- Harpalus italus Schaum, 1860

Species of beetle

Harpalus italus is a species of ground beetle in the subfamily Harpalinae. It was described by Schaum in 1860.
