= Harpalus babai =

Scientific classification
- Kingdom: Animalia
- Phylum: Arthropoda
- Class: Insecta
- Order: Coleoptera
- Suborder: Adephaga
- Family: Carabidae
- Genus: Harpalus
- Species: H. babai

Binomial name
- Harpalus babai Habu, 1973

Species of beetle

Harpalus babai is a species of ground beetle in the subfamily Harpalinae. It was described by Habu in 1973.
