= Empecamenta sequax =

Scientific classification
- Kingdom: Animalia
- Phylum: Arthropoda
- Clade: Pancrustacea
- Class: Insecta
- Order: Coleoptera
- Suborder: Polyphaga
- Infraorder: Scarabaeiformia
- Family: Scarabaeidae
- Genus: Empecamenta
- Species: E. sequax

Binomial name
- Empecamenta sequax (Kolbe, 1914)

Synonyms
- Isocamenta sequax Kolbe, 1914

Species of beetle

Empecamenta sequax is a species of beetle of the family Scarabaeidae. It is found in Rwanda and Burundi.

== Description ==
Adults reach a length of about 11.5–12 mm (0.45–0.47 in). They are similar to Empecamenta ugandana, but have a somewhat slimmer body and have dense and rough punctation on the frons. The punctution on the pronotum is less short but more dense and the elytra are somewhat narrower and longer, but are similarly punctate.
