= Melanocamenta densata =

Scientific classification
- Kingdom: Animalia
- Phylum: Arthropoda
- Clade: Pancrustacea
- Class: Insecta
- Order: Coleoptera
- Suborder: Polyphaga
- Infraorder: Scarabaeiformia
- Family: Scarabaeidae
- Genus: Melanocamenta
- Species: M. densata

Binomial name
- Melanocamenta densata Kolbe, 1914

Species of beetle

Melanocamenta densata is a species of beetle of the family Scarabaeidae. It is found in Tanzania.

== Description ==
Adults reach a length of about 7.5 mm (0.30 in). They are similar to Melanocamenta uvinsana, but the body is less short, the head is almost blackish-brown, the pronotum is reddish-brown, the elytra dark yellowish-brown (but black at the edges), the pygidium brown and the underside and legs dark brown (although the forelegs are reddish-brown).
