= Empecamenta disparilis =

Scientific classification
- Kingdom: Animalia
- Phylum: Arthropoda
- Clade: Pancrustacea
- Class: Insecta
- Order: Coleoptera
- Suborder: Polyphaga
- Infraorder: Scarabaeiformia
- Family: Scarabaeidae
- Genus: Empecamenta
- Species: E. disparilis

Binomial name
- Empecamenta disparilis Moser, 1917

Species of beetle

Empecamenta disparilis is a species of beetle of the family Scarabaeidae. It is found in the Democratic Republic of the Congo.

== Description ==
Adults reach a length of about 11 mm. They are similar to Empecamenta collaris, but the middle of the pronotum is not dull. The head is very unevenly punctured, the punctures covered with yellow setae. The pronotum is sparsely covered with fine and coarse punctures. The coarse punctures are pubescent. The elytra have moderately dense, rather robust punctures and there are erect hairs arranged in rows, particularly along the sides.
