= Paracamenta suturalis =

Scientific classification
- Kingdom: Animalia
- Phylum: Arthropoda
- Class: Insecta
- Order: Coleoptera
- Suborder: Polyphaga
- Infraorder: Scarabaeiformia
- Family: Scarabaeidae
- Genus: Paracamenta
- Species: P. suturalis

Binomial name
- Paracamenta suturalis Péringuey, 1904

Species of beetle

Paracamenta suturalis is a species of beetle of the family Scarabaeidae. It is found in South Africa (KwaZulu-Natal).

== Description ==
Adults reach a length of about 10.5 mm. They are testaceous, with the posterior part of the clypeus, the head, the median discoidal part of the prothorax and a broad sutural band black. The antennae are rufescent. The build and sculpture are similar to those of Paracamenta conspicua, but without a fringe of long hairs along the sides of the prothorax and elytra.
