= Phyllocamenta =

Scientific classification
- Kingdom: Animalia
- Phylum: Arthropoda
- Clade: Pancrustacea
- Class: Insecta
- Order: Coleoptera
- Suborder: Polyphaga
- Infraorder: Scarabaeiformia
- Family: Scarabaeidae
- Subfamily: Sericinae
- Tribe: Ablaberini
- Genus: Phyllocamenta; Moser, 1918
- Species: P. pilosa

Binomial name
- Phyllocamenta pilosa (Quedenfeldt, 1884)

Synonyms
- Camenta pilosa Quedenfeldt, 1884

Genus of beetles

Phyllocamenta is a genus of beetle of the family Scarabaeidae. It is monotypic, being represented by the single species, Phyllocamenta pilosa, which is found in Angola.

== Description ==
Adults resemble (in shape, pubescence, and head structure) the species of the genus Empecamenta, but have a different structure of the antennae. The antennae are ten-segmented and are long and curved.
