= Mitracamenta adelpha =

Scientific classification
- Kingdom: Animalia
- Phylum: Arthropoda
- Clade: Pancrustacea
- Class: Insecta
- Order: Coleoptera
- Suborder: Polyphaga
- Infraorder: Scarabaeiformia
- Family: Scarabaeidae
- Genus: Mitracamenta
- Species: M. adelpha

Binomial name
- Mitracamenta adelpha Kolbe, 1914

Species of beetle

Mitracamenta adelpha is a species of beetle of the family Scarabaeidae. It is found in Rwanda and Burundi.

== Description ==
Adults reach a length of about 7–8 mm (0.28–0.31 in). They are brown or blackish-brown and shiny, with yellowish-grey setae. They are similar to Mitracamenta lineella, especially with regard to size, appearance and colour, but the upper surface is shinier, the elytra are less densely punctate and the clypeus is less deeply emarginate.
