= Empecamenta hirtella =

Scientific classification
- Kingdom: Animalia
- Phylum: Arthropoda
- Clade: Pancrustacea
- Class: Insecta
- Order: Coleoptera
- Suborder: Polyphaga
- Infraorder: Scarabaeiformia
- Family: Scarabaeidae
- Genus: Empecamenta
- Species: E. hirtella

Binomial name
- Empecamenta hirtella Moser, 1914

Species of beetle

Empecamenta hirtella is a species of beetle of the family Scarabaeidae. It is found in Kenya.

== Description ==
Adults reach a length of about 9 mm (0.35 in). They are similar to Empecamenta bennigseni. The colouration is reddish-brown, with all punctures on the upper and lower surfaces bearing yellow hairs. The head is coarsely, weakly wrinkled-punctate, and the transverse keel of the clypeus is slightly projecting in the middle. Immediately before the keel, the clypeus is smooth, while before the anterior margin it is sparsely punctured. The latter is deeply arched. The antennae are yellowish-brown. The pronotum is short, its lateral margins very weakly notched, the anterior and posterior angles rounded, and the surface rather sparsely punctured in the middle, becoming somewhat more closely punctured towards the sides. The scutellum bears only a few bristle-like punctures. The elytra and pygidium are moderately densely punctured and the thorax is sparsely covered with yellow hairs, while the abdomen is rather sparsely covered with hairy punctures.
