= Empecamenta matabelena =

Scientific classification
- Kingdom: Animalia
- Phylum: Arthropoda
- Clade: Pancrustacea
- Class: Insecta
- Order: Coleoptera
- Suborder: Polyphaga
- Infraorder: Scarabaeiformia
- Family: Scarabaeidae
- Genus: Empecamenta
- Species: E. matabelena

Binomial name
- Empecamenta matabelena (Péringuey, 1904)

Synonyms
- Camenta (Empecamenta) matabelena Péringuey, 1904

Species of beetle

Empecamenta matabelena is a species of beetle of the family Scarabaeidae. It is found in Zimbabwe.

== Description ==
Adults reach a length of about 8.5–9 mm. They are black, and covered with an erect flavescent pubescence. They are similar to Empecamenta nigra, but more robust, and the shape of the clypeus is different, being incised laterally and narrowed towards the anterior part as in E. nigra, but the apical angles are very broadly rounded, and the median part deeply and broadly notched and very plainly reflexed in both sexes, the transverse clypeal keel is quite distinct, and the clypeal suture is indicated in the male by a fringe of hairs, but is visible in the female, the pubescence is denser and longer, especially on the head and prothorax. The elytra are deeply punctured, but not coriaceous and the antennal club of the male is slightly shorter than the pedicel, and therefore not as long as in E. nigra.
