= Empecamenta impressiceps =

Scientific classification
- Kingdom: Animalia
- Phylum: Arthropoda
- Clade: Pancrustacea
- Class: Insecta
- Order: Coleoptera
- Suborder: Polyphaga
- Infraorder: Scarabaeiformia
- Family: Scarabaeidae
- Genus: Empecamenta
- Species: E. impressiceps

Binomial name
- Empecamenta impressiceps Moser, 1914

Species of beetle

Empecamenta impressiceps is a species of beetle of the family Scarabaeidae. It is found in Cameroon and Equatorial Guinea (Bioko).

== Description ==
Adults reach a length of about 11 mm (0.43 in). They are similar to Empecamenta usambarae, and dark chestnut brown. The frons is coarsely punctured, the punctures bearing erect setae. The frontal suture is indistinct. The clypeus is punctate laterally at the base, but otherwise without punctures. The transverse keel of the clypeus runs almost straight, with two deep impressions behind it and a transverse row of setae in front of it. The anterior margin of the clypeus is deeply arched. The pronotum is short, moderately densely punctured, and bears, in addition to the shallower punctures, coarser, erect-haired punctures, particularly in the anterior part. The scutellum is smooth. The elytra are quite densely punctured, with only a few punctures covered with hairs. On the pygidium, the punctures are moderately dense and bear erect hairs.
