= Empecamenta clypeata =

Scientific classification
- Kingdom: Animalia
- Phylum: Arthropoda
- Clade: Pancrustacea
- Class: Insecta
- Order: Coleoptera
- Suborder: Polyphaga
- Infraorder: Scarabaeiformia
- Family: Scarabaeidae
- Genus: Empecamenta
- Species: E. clypeata

Binomial name
- Empecamenta clypeata Moser, 1914

Species of beetle

Empecamenta clypeata is a species of beetle of the family Scarabaeidae. It is found in the Democratic Republic of the Congo.

== Description ==
Adults reach a length of about 11 mm (0.43 in). They are similar to Empecamenta angustata, but easily distinguished by the shape of the head. The anterior margin of the clypeus is rather deeply arched and the space between the anterior margin and the transverse keel of the clypeus, which projects slightly forward in the middle, is smooth and bears only a transverse row of robust setae immediately in front of the keel. The space between the transverse keel and the distinct frontal suture is coarsely punctate and shows two impressions in the middle. Between these impressions is a small, smooth triangle, the base of which merges with the frontal suture. The frons bears very large, erect setae. The pronotum is almost twice as wide as it is long, its sides are weakly notched, the posterior angles broad, and the anterior angles short and rounded. The surface is moderately densely punctate and covered with long, erect yellow hairs. The scutellum has smooth lateral margins and apex. The elytra, which lack ribs, also show moderately dense punctation and erect hairs. The punctures on the pygidium are more densely packed and bear yellow bristles. The thorax and abdomen are covered with sparsely spaced, arched punctures fringed with yellowish-brown hairs.
