= Balbera anjouanae =

Scientific classification
- Kingdom: Animalia
- Phylum: Arthropoda
- Class: Insecta
- Order: Coleoptera
- Suborder: Polyphaga
- Infraorder: Scarabaeiformia
- Family: Scarabaeidae
- Genus: Balbera
- Species: B. anjouanae

Binomial name
- Balbera anjouanae Lacroix, 1994

Species of beetle

Balbera anjouanae is a species of beetle of the family Scarabaeidae. It is found on the Comoros.

== Description ==
Adults reach a length of about 6 mm. They are similar to Balbera gracilis, but the clypeus has a narrower anterior portion, the protibia has a prominent oblique apex behind the apical tooth and the parameres are short, curved and flattened on the apex.
