= Cyrtocamenta holdhausi =

Scientific classification
- Kingdom: Animalia
- Phylum: Arthropoda
- Clade: Pancrustacea
- Class: Insecta
- Order: Coleoptera
- Suborder: Polyphaga
- Infraorder: Scarabaeiformia
- Family: Scarabaeidae
- Genus: Cyrtocamenta
- Species: C. holdhausi

Binomial name
- Cyrtocamenta holdhausi Moser, 1914

Species of beetle

Cyrtocamenta holdhausi is a species of beetle of the family Scarabaeidae. It is found in Tanzania.

== Description ==
Adults reach a length of about 7.5 mm (0.30 in). They are similar in colour and shape to Cyrtocamenta rubra, but the anterior margin of the clypeus is only arcuate and not, as in rubra, weakly projecting in the middle of the indentation. The head is densely punctate, the frontal suture raised, and the transverse keel of the clypeus is weakly bicuspid. Anterior to the transverse keel, the clypeus is sparsely punctate. The pronotum is of similar shape and sculpture to that of rubra, and the scutellum is sparsely punctate. On the elytra, the punctures are quite dense, and traces of ribs are faintly indicated. The pygidium is somewhat less densely covered with umbilical punctures than the elytra. The underside is only sparsely punctate, and the punctures are covered with yellow hairs.
