= Empecamenta schubotzi =

Scientific classification
- Kingdom: Animalia
- Phylum: Arthropoda
- Clade: Pancrustacea
- Class: Insecta
- Order: Coleoptera
- Suborder: Polyphaga
- Infraorder: Scarabaeiformia
- Family: Scarabaeidae
- Genus: Empecamenta
- Species: E. schubotzi

Binomial name
- Empecamenta schubotzi (Kolbe, 1914)

Synonyms
- Isocamenta schubotzi Kolbe, 1914

Species of beetle

Empecamenta schubotzi is a species of beetle of the family Scarabaeidae. It is found in the Democratic Republic of the Congo.

== Description ==
Adults reach a length of about 11.5 mm (0.45 in). They are similar to Empecamenta montana, but more robustly built. Although similarly setate, the setae are even more scattered and less fine. Furthermore, the elytra are more simply and evenly punctate.
