= Melanocamenta inflata =

Scientific classification
- Kingdom: Animalia
- Phylum: Arthropoda
- Clade: Pancrustacea
- Class: Insecta
- Order: Coleoptera
- Suborder: Polyphaga
- Infraorder: Scarabaeiformia
- Family: Scarabaeidae
- Genus: Melanocamenta
- Species: M. inflata

Binomial name
- Melanocamenta inflata Moser, 1914

Species of beetle

Melanocamenta inflata is a species of beetle of the family Scarabaeidae. It is found in Tanzania.

== Description ==
Adults reach a length of about 10–11 mm (0.39–0.43 in). They are similar in shape to Melanocamenta kolbei, but considerably larger. The head is extremely finely and widely punctate, the frontal suture is keeled, the transverse keel of the clypeus is strongly curved backward, and the anterior margin of the clypeus is very deeply arched, giving it a bilobed appearance. The pronotum is smooth and similarly structured to that of kolbei and the scutellum is also without punctures. The elytra however, are moderately densely covered with rather coarse punctures. Flat, smooth ribs are only very indistinctly marked. In males, the pygidium is not very densely covered with coarser or weaker punctures across its entire surface; sometimes a smooth central line is visible. In females however, the pygidium is only punctured in the posterior half, while the anterior half is smooth. In both sexes, erect hairs are present in front of the posterior margin of the pygidium. The underside is widely punctured in the middle, becoming somewhat more densely punctured at the sides. The punctures are of unequal strength and the stronger ones are hairy.
