= Cyrtocamenta ovampoensis =

Scientific classification
- Kingdom: Animalia
- Phylum: Arthropoda
- Clade: Pancrustacea
- Class: Insecta
- Order: Coleoptera
- Suborder: Polyphaga
- Infraorder: Scarabaeiformia
- Family: Scarabaeidae
- Genus: Cyrtocamenta
- Species: C. ovampoensis

Binomial name
- Cyrtocamenta ovampoensis (Péringuey, 1904)

Synonyms
- Microcamenta ovampoensis Péringuey, 1904

Species of beetle

Cyrtocamenta ovampoensis is a species of beetle of the family Scarabaeidae. It is found in Namibia.

== Description ==
Adults reach a length of about 7 mm. They are very light straw-colour, with the antennae and palpi of the same hue. They are similar to Cyrtocamenta sebakuensis in shape and size, but may be distinguished by the shape of the clypeus, the anterior margin of which is bi-sinuate.
