= Paracamenta calva =

Scientific classification
- Kingdom: Animalia
- Phylum: Arthropoda
- Class: Insecta
- Order: Coleoptera
- Suborder: Polyphaga
- Infraorder: Scarabaeiformia
- Family: Scarabaeidae
- Genus: Paracamenta
- Species: P. calva

Binomial name
- Paracamenta calva Péringuey, 1904

Species of beetle

Paracamenta calva is a species of beetle of the family Scarabaeidae. It is found in South Africa (Limpopo).

== Description ==
Adults reach a length of about 6–7 mm. They are similar to Paracamenta verticalis but a little smaller and more reddish. The prothorax and the elytra are similar in shape and sculpture, but are fringed laterally with short, somewhat remote hairs. The underside is equally hairy.
