= Cyrtocamenta rubra =

Scientific classification
- Kingdom: Animalia
- Phylum: Arthropoda
- Clade: Pancrustacea
- Class: Insecta
- Order: Coleoptera
- Suborder: Polyphaga
- Infraorder: Scarabaeiformia
- Family: Scarabaeidae
- Genus: Cyrtocamenta
- Species: C. rubra

Binomial name
- Cyrtocamenta rubra Brenske, 1897

Species of beetle

Cyrtocamenta rubra is a species of beetle of the family Scarabaeidae. It is found in Namibia.

== Description ==
Adults reach a length of about 7–7.5 mm (0.28–0.30 in). They are reddish-brown, and more robust than Cyrtocamenta flavescens and Cyrtocamenta pygmaea. They are almost uniformly strongly punctate.
