= Empecamenta crinalis =

Scientific classification
- Kingdom: Animalia
- Phylum: Arthropoda
- Clade: Pancrustacea
- Class: Insecta
- Order: Coleoptera
- Suborder: Polyphaga
- Infraorder: Scarabaeiformia
- Family: Scarabaeidae
- Genus: Empecamenta
- Species: E. crinalis

Binomial name
- Empecamenta crinalis Moser, 1919

Species of beetle

Empecamenta crinalis is a species of beetle of the family Scarabaeidae. It is found in Uganda.

== Description ==
Adults reach a length of about 7–9 mm. They are similar to Empecamenta ugandana. They are reddish-brown and glossy, with yellow hairs. The head is robustly and somewhat wrinkledly punctate. The pronotum is twice as wide as it is long, strongly arched in the middle. The lateral margins are finely serrated, the anterior angles are short and the posterior angles broadly rounded. The surface is much more sparsely and coarsely punctate than in ugandana and the punctures are covered with long, erect hairs. The scutellum shows only a few punctures. On the elytra, the punctures are likewise coarser than in ugandana and the ribs are also absent. The pygidium is quite densely and rather coarsely punctate, the punctures are covered with erect hairs. On the underside, the hairy punctures are moderately dense.
