= Brachymis piligera =

Scientific classification
- Kingdom: Animalia
- Phylum: Arthropoda
- Clade: Pancrustacea
- Class: Insecta
- Order: Coleoptera
- Suborder: Polyphaga
- Infraorder: Scarabaeiformia
- Family: Scarabaeidae
- Genus: Brachymis
- Species: B. piligera

Binomial name
- Brachymis piligera (Moser, 1914)

Synonyms
- Apocamenta piligera Moser, 1914

Species of beetle

Brachymis piligera is a species of beetle of the family Scarabaeidae. It is found in Tanzania.

== Description ==
Adults reach a length of about 12–13 mm (0.47–0.51 in). They are similar to Brachymis grossa, but may be distinguished by the different sculpture of the pronotum. The head bears very coarse punctures, which are covered with erect setae. The frontal suture is not discernible, the transverse keel is very shallowly curved forward. Immediately in front of the clypeus keel is a transverse row of setae, and the clypeus between this row of setae and the anterior margin is almost smooth. The latter is deeply arched. The pronotum is similar in shape to that of grossa, but its surface is only sparsely punctate and the punctures on the elytra are not quite as dense as in grossa, and alongside the stronger, hairy punctures, there are also fine, hairless ones. The pygidium is sparsely or moderately densely covered with hairy punctures. The punctation on the underside is sparse, except on the sides of the thorax, where the punctures are quite close together. The punctures on the underside are also hairy.
