= Empecamenta calabarica =

Scientific classification
- Kingdom: Animalia
- Phylum: Arthropoda
- Clade: Pancrustacea
- Class: Insecta
- Order: Coleoptera
- Suborder: Polyphaga
- Infraorder: Scarabaeiformia
- Family: Scarabaeidae
- Genus: Empecamenta
- Species: E. calabarica

Binomial name
- Empecamenta calabarica Moser, 1921

Species of beetle

Empecamenta calabarica is a species of beetle of the family Scarabaeidae. It is found in Nigeria.

== Description ==
Adults reach a length of about 8 mm. They are light chestnut-brown, with yellowish hairs. The head is strongly punctate and the antennae are reddish-yellow. The pronotum is moderately densely, but strongly punctate, with hairy punctures. The scutellum is sparsely punctate. The elytra are very slightly rugose, and not very densely covered with hairy punctures.
