= Oocamenta =

Scientific classification
- Kingdom: Animalia
- Phylum: Arthropoda
- Class: Insecta
- Order: Coleoptera
- Suborder: Polyphaga
- Infraorder: Scarabaeiformia
- Family: Scarabaeidae
- Subfamily: Sericinae
- Tribe: Ablaberini
- Genus: Oocamenta; Péringuey, 1904

Genus of leaf beetles

Oocamenta is a genus of beetles belonging to the family Scarabaeidae.

== Species ==
- Subgenus Oocamenta
  - Oocamenta rufiventris (Burmeister, 1855)
- Subgenus Pseudocamenta Péringuey, 1904
  - Oocamenta transvaalia Péringuey, 1904
