= Plesiocamenta =

Scientific classification
- Kingdom: Animalia
- Phylum: Arthropoda
- Clade: Pancrustacea
- Class: Insecta
- Order: Coleoptera
- Suborder: Polyphaga
- Infraorder: Scarabaeiformia
- Family: Scarabaeidae
- Subfamily: Sericinae
- Tribe: Ablaberini
- Genus: Plesiocamenta; Lacroix & Montreuil, 2019
- Species: P. murphyi

Binomial name
- Plesiocamenta murphyi Lacroix & Montreuil, 2019

Genus of beetles

Plesiocamenta is a genus of beetle of the family Scarabaeidae. It is monotypic, being represented by the single species, Plesiocamenta murphyi, which is found in Malawi.

== Description ==
Adults reach a length of about 11–12 mm (0.43–0.47 in). They have a slightly elongated body, widened at the apex. The forebody and legs are dark brown to blackish, while the elytra are lighter chestnut brown.

== Etymology ==
The species is named after its collector, the amateur entomologist Raymond James Murphy.
