= Cyrtocamenta =

Scientific classification
- Kingdom: Animalia
- Phylum: Arthropoda
- Class: Insecta
- Order: Coleoptera
- Suborder: Polyphaga
- Infraorder: Scarabaeiformia
- Family: Scarabaeidae
- Subfamily: Sericinae
- Tribe: Ablaberini
- Genus: Cyrtocamenta; Brenske, 1897

Synonyms
- Microcamenta Brenske, 1898

Genus of leaf beetles

Cyrtocamenta is a genus of beetles belonging to the family Scarabaeidae.

== Species ==
- Cyrtocamenta bechynei Frey, 1976
- Cyrtocamenta flavescens Brenske, 1897
- Cyrtocamenta fortipes Burgeon, 1945
- Cyrtocamenta herberti (Frey, 1968)
- Cyrtocamenta holdhausi Moser, 1914
- Cyrtocamenta massarti Burgeon, 1945
- Cyrtocamenta ovampoensis (Péringuey, 1904)
- Cyrtocamenta pallida Ahrens, 2000
- Cyrtocamenta pygidialis (Frey, 1968)
- Cyrtocamenta pygmaea Brenske, 1897
- Cyrtocamenta rubra Brenske, 1897
- Cyrtocamenta sebakuensis (Péringuey, 1904)
- Cyrtocamenta similis (Frey, 1968)
- Cyrtocamenta transvaalensis (Brenske, 1898)
- Cyrtocamenta zumpti (Frey, 1968)
