= Hemicamenta tumida =

Scientific classification
- Kingdom: Animalia
- Phylum: Arthropoda
- Class: Insecta
- Order: Coleoptera
- Suborder: Polyphaga
- Infraorder: Scarabaeiformia
- Family: Scarabaeidae
- Genus: Hemicamenta
- Species: H. tumida

Binomial name
- Hemicamenta tumida (Péringuey, 1904)

Synonyms
- Camenta (Hemicamenta) tumida Péringuey, 1904

Species of beetle

Hemicamenta tumida is a species of beetle of the family Scarabaeidae. It is found in South Africa (Eastern Cape).

== Description ==
Adults reach a length of about 11-12.5 mm. The head and prothorax are piceous and the elytra are chestnut-brown. The clypeus is incised laterally past the median part, and narrowed thence to the sharp anterior angles, which, however, do not project. The head is covered with nearly contiguous round punctures and the prothorax has sub-contiguous round punctures and the outer margins serrulate in the posterior parts. The elytra are very convex, with the intervals between the very plainly raised costules filled with equi-distant, round, deep punctures.
