= Empecamenta hirta =

Scientific classification
- Kingdom: Animalia
- Phylum: Arthropoda
- Clade: Pancrustacea
- Class: Insecta
- Order: Coleoptera
- Suborder: Polyphaga
- Infraorder: Scarabaeiformia
- Family: Scarabaeidae
- Genus: Empecamenta
- Species: E. hirta

Binomial name
- Empecamenta hirta Moser, 1917

Species of beetle

Empecamenta hirta is a species of beetle of the family Scarabaeidae. It is found in Tanzania.

== Description ==
Adults reach a length of about 7 mm. They are brown, with the head and sometimes the pronotum darker. The head is moderately densely and coarsely punctate, the punctures with erect yellow hairs. The pronotum is sparsely covered with yellow-haired punctures. The elytra are punctate. The punctures are hairy.
