= Tulbaghia patruelis =

Scientific classification
- Kingdom: Animalia
- Phylum: Arthropoda
- Class: Insecta
- Order: Coleoptera
- Suborder: Polyphaga
- Infraorder: Scarabaeiformia
- Family: Scarabaeidae
- Genus: Tulbaghia
- Species: T. patruelis

Binomial name
- Tulbaghia patruelis Péringuey, 1908

Species of beetle

Tulbaghia patruelis is a species of beetle of the family Scarabaeidae. It is found in South Africa (Western Cape).

== Description ==
Adults reach a length of about 6.5 mm. They are piceous red with the legs sub-rufescent, and also the palps and the pedicels of the antennae (the club of which is fuscous). The prothorax is plainly punctulate, the punctures divided by an interval slightly smaller than their own diameter. The scutellum is weakly punctate and the elytra are weakly bi-costulate and the surface is sub-coriaceous. The sides of the elytra and prothorax have a fringe of long bristle-like hairs.
