= Empecamenta coronata =

Scientific classification
- Kingdom: Animalia
- Phylum: Arthropoda
- Clade: Pancrustacea
- Class: Insecta
- Order: Coleoptera
- Suborder: Polyphaga
- Infraorder: Scarabaeiformia
- Family: Scarabaeidae
- Genus: Empecamenta
- Species: E. coronata

Binomial name
- Empecamenta coronata Frey, 1972

Species of beetle

Empecamenta coronata is a species of beetle of the family Scarabaeidae. It is found in Somalia.

== Description ==
Adults reach a length of about 8 mm. The upper and lower surfaces are brown and shiny, with the legs somewhat darker. The antennae are light brown. The head has a few long, erect, light brown hairs and the pronotum is sparsely covered with long, erect hairs. The elytra are very sparsely haired. The margins of the pronotum and elytra are densely covered with longer cilia.
