= Brachymis rugifrons =

Scientific classification
- Kingdom: Animalia
- Phylum: Arthropoda
- Clade: Pancrustacea
- Class: Insecta
- Order: Coleoptera
- Suborder: Polyphaga
- Infraorder: Scarabaeiformia
- Family: Scarabaeidae
- Genus: Brachymis
- Species: B. rugifrons

Binomial name
- Brachymis rugifrons Moser, 1914

Species of beetle

Brachymis rugifrons is a species of beetle of the family Scarabaeidae. It is found in Ethiopia.

== Description ==
Adults reach a length of about 12 mm (0.47 in). They are similar to Brachymis pubens, but may be distinguished by the much more wrinkled and punctured surface of the head. In front of the clypeus, which curves flatly forward in the middle, the clypeus is smooth and bears a transverse row of erect setae. The pronotum is similar in shape to that of pubens, but the punctures on it are much less densely spaced. Both the pronotum and the elytra are only sparsely pubescent, though the hairs may be worn. The scutellum bears a few punctures in the middle. The elytra are fairly densely punctured, the punctures not quite as strong as in pubens, and the spaces between the punctures are weakly wrinkled. The pygidium is moderately densely covered with pubescent, strong punctures. The thorax is covered with long, dense yellow hair, and the abdomen is finely and sparsely punctured, and the punctures are covered with hair.
