= Tulbaghia lightfooti =

Scientific classification
- Kingdom: Animalia
- Phylum: Arthropoda
- Class: Insecta
- Order: Coleoptera
- Suborder: Polyphaga
- Infraorder: Scarabaeiformia
- Family: Scarabaeidae
- Genus: Tulbaghia
- Species: T. lightfooti

Binomial name
- Tulbaghia lightfooti Péringuey, 1904

Species of beetle

Tulbaghia lightfooti is a species of beetle of the family Scarabaeidae. It is found in South Africa (Western Cape).

== Description ==
Adults reach a length of about 11 mm. The head and prothorax are dark chestnut, while the elytra, pygidium, underside and legs are lighter chestnut-brown. The antennae of the males are also chestnut-brown. The prothorax is fringed with long, somewhat dense hairs, and covered with deep somewhat irregularly disposed punctures. The elytra are closely and somewhat deeply pitted and the outer margin is fringed with somewhat long hairs.
