= Archocamenta flava =

Scientific classification
- Kingdom: Animalia
- Phylum: Arthropoda
- Clade: Pancrustacea
- Class: Insecta
- Order: Coleoptera
- Suborder: Polyphaga
- Infraorder: Scarabaeiformia
- Family: Scarabaeidae
- Genus: Archocamenta
- Species: A. flava

Binomial name
- Archocamenta flava Brenske, 1895

Species of beetle

Archocamenta flava is a species of beetle of the family Scarabaeidae. It is found in Ethiopia.

== Description ==
Adults reach a length of about 7–7.5 mm (0.28–0.30 in). They have an elongate, yellow body. The dorsal surface is devoid of hair, except for a distinct row of setiferous punctures on the anterior part of the clypeus, between the faint carina and the front margin, as well as on the sides of the pronotum and the elytra.
