= Melanocamenta angolensis =

Scientific classification
- Kingdom: Animalia
- Phylum: Arthropoda
- Clade: Pancrustacea
- Class: Insecta
- Order: Coleoptera
- Suborder: Polyphaga
- Infraorder: Scarabaeiformia
- Family: Scarabaeidae
- Genus: Melanocamenta
- Species: M. angolensis

Binomial name
- Melanocamenta angolensis Moser, 1920

Species of beetle

Melanocamenta angolensis is a species of beetle of the family Scarabaeidae. It is found in Angola.

== Description ==
Adults reach a length of about 6 mm. The head, pronotum, scutellum and tip of the elytra are black, while the underside and legs are blackish-brown.
