= Archocamenta =

Scientific classification
- Kingdom: Animalia
- Phylum: Arthropoda
- Class: Insecta
- Order: Coleoptera
- Suborder: Polyphaga
- Infraorder: Scarabaeiformia
- Family: Scarabaeidae
- Subfamily: Sericinae
- Tribe: Ablaberini
- Genus: Archocamenta; Brenske, 1895

Genus of leaf beetles

Archocamenta is a genus of beetles belonging to the family Scarabaeidae.

== Species ==
- Archocamenta ascendens Kolbe, 1910
- Archocamenta flava Brenske, 1895
- Archocamenta pilosa (Fåhraeus, 1857)
- Archocamenta ventricosa (Boheman, 1860)
