= Idaecamenta jucunda =

Scientific classification
- Kingdom: Animalia
- Phylum: Arthropoda
- Class: Insecta
- Order: Coleoptera
- Suborder: Polyphaga
- Infraorder: Scarabaeiformia
- Family: Scarabaeidae
- Genus: Idaecamenta
- Species: I. jucunda

Binomial name
- Idaecamenta jucunda Péringuey, 1904

Species of beetle

Idaecamenta jucunda is a species of beetle of the family Scarabaeidae. It is found in South Africa (KwaZulu-Natal, Mpumalanga, North West) and Zimbabwe.

== Description ==
Adults reach a length of about 11–13 mm. They are pale testaceous or testaceous-red, with the antennae flavous. The prothorax is covered with somewhat closely set round punctures, while the scutellum is impunctate. The elytra are deeply and somewhat closely punctured, and with the costules very plain. The pygidium and abdomen are as deeply and quite as closely punctured as the elytra, the pubescence on the latter fairly long.
