= Empecamenta buettikeri =

Scientific classification
- Kingdom: Animalia
- Phylum: Arthropoda
- Clade: Pancrustacea
- Class: Insecta
- Order: Coleoptera
- Suborder: Polyphaga
- Infraorder: Scarabaeiformia
- Family: Scarabaeidae
- Genus: Empecamenta
- Species: E. buettikeri

Binomial name
- Empecamenta buettikeri Ahrens, 2000

Species of beetle

Empecamenta buettikeri is a species of beetle of the family Scarabaeidae. It is found in Saudi Arabia.

== Description ==
Adults reach a length of about 9.5-9.9 mm. They have a reddish-brown, oblong body. The dorsal surface is shiny and has long, moderately dense hairs.
