= Cyrtocamenta pygidialis =

Scientific classification
- Kingdom: Animalia
- Phylum: Arthropoda
- Clade: Pancrustacea
- Class: Insecta
- Order: Coleoptera
- Suborder: Polyphaga
- Infraorder: Scarabaeiformia
- Family: Scarabaeidae
- Genus: Cyrtocamenta
- Species: C. pygidialis

Binomial name
- Cyrtocamenta pygidialis (Frey, 1968)

Synonyms
- Microcamenta pygidialis Frey, 1968; Camenta sudanica Frey, 1970

Species of beetle

Cyrtocamenta pygidialis is a species of beetle of the family Scarabaeidae. It is found in Chad, Kenya, Sudan, Egypt, Saudi Arabia and Yemen.

== Description ==
Adults reach a length of about 7.3–8.5 mm. They have a yellowish-brown, oblong body. The dorsal surface is shiny and is mostly glabrous, except for the lateral ciliation of the pronotum and elytra.
