= Pericamenta =

Scientific classification
- Kingdom: Animalia
- Phylum: Arthropoda
- Class: Insecta
- Order: Coleoptera
- Suborder: Polyphaga
- Infraorder: Scarabaeiformia
- Family: Scarabaeidae
- Subfamily: Sericinae
- Tribe: Ablaberini
- Genus: Pericamenta; Péringuey, 1904
- Species: P. paupercula

Binomial name
- Pericamenta paupercula Péringuey, 1904

Genus of beetles

Pericamenta is a genus of beetle of the family Scarabaeidae. It is monotypic, being represented by the single species, Pericamenta paupercula, which is found in South Africa.

== Description ==
Adults reach a length of about 10 mm. They are dark chestnut-brown, with the head and prothorax fuscous, the antennae rufescent and the legs piceous. The head and prothorax are covered with punctures of the same size and the elongate elytra are somewhat deeply punctured with the intervals slightly coriaceous, and the costules are quite visible.
