= Empecamenta insulicola =

Scientific classification
- Kingdom: Animalia
- Phylum: Arthropoda
- Clade: Pancrustacea
- Class: Insecta
- Order: Coleoptera
- Suborder: Polyphaga
- Infraorder: Scarabaeiformia
- Family: Scarabaeidae
- Genus: Empecamenta
- Species: E. insulicola

Binomial name
- Empecamenta insulicola Moser, 1919

Species of beetle

Empecamenta insulicola is a species of beetle of the family Scarabaeidae. It is found in Uganda.

== Description ==
Adults reach a length of about 10 mm. The head bears strong, wrinkled punctation. The pronotum is twice as wide as it is long posteriorly, strongly arched in the middle. The lateral margins are weakly notched and the anterior and posterior angles are rounded. The surface is covered with moderately closely spaced, coarse punctures, which are covered with long, erect hairs. The scutellum shows only a few hairy punctures. On the elytra, the hairy punctures are also strong and moderately dense, without finer punctures in between. Ribs are absent. On the pygidium, the punctures are somewhat closer together than on the elytra. The underside is covered with yellow hairs.
