= Archocamenta ventricosa =

Scientific classification
- Kingdom: Animalia
- Phylum: Arthropoda
- Clade: Pancrustacea
- Class: Insecta
- Order: Coleoptera
- Suborder: Polyphaga
- Infraorder: Scarabaeiformia
- Family: Scarabaeidae
- Genus: Archocamenta
- Species: A. ventricosa

Binomial name
- Archocamenta ventricosa (Boheman, 1860)

Synonyms
- Camenta ventricosa Boheman, 1860

Species of beetle

Archocamenta ventricosa is a species of beetle of the family Scarabaeidae. It is found in Botswana.

== Description ==
Adults reach a length of about 9.75 mm. They have an ovate, convex, piceous-black, shining body. The antennae and palpi are testaceous and the abdomen is obscurely ferruginous. The head is closely punctate and the prothorax is very finely and moderately closely punctate. The elytra are not deeply, yet moderately closely punctate, but more lightly and sparingly in the posterior than in the anterior part.
