= Empecamenta zambesina =

Scientific classification
- Kingdom: Animalia
- Phylum: Arthropoda
- Clade: Pancrustacea
- Class: Insecta
- Order: Coleoptera
- Suborder: Polyphaga
- Infraorder: Scarabaeiformia
- Family: Scarabaeidae
- Genus: Empecamenta
- Species: E. zambesina

Binomial name
- Empecamenta zambesina (Péringuey, 1904)

Synonyms
- Camenta (Empecamenta) zambesina Péringuey, 1904

Species of beetle

Empecamenta zambesina is a species of beetle of the family Scarabaeidae. It is found in Zimbabwe.

== Description ==
Adults reach a length of about 6.5–7.5 mm. They are black, with the elytra light chestnut, clothed with a flavescent pubescence, which is very long and villose on the head and prothorax.. The head and the posterior part of the clypeus are closely punctured, the prothorax moderately so, and the punctures on the elytra are equi-distant, deep but with smooth intervals, and bear each a short hair. The antennae are rufo-flavescent.
