= Tarsocamenta =

Scientific classification
- Kingdom: Animalia
- Phylum: Arthropoda
- Clade: Pancrustacea
- Class: Insecta
- Order: Coleoptera
- Suborder: Polyphaga
- Infraorder: Scarabaeiformia
- Family: Scarabaeidae
- Subfamily: Sericinae
- Tribe: Ablaberini
- Genus: Tarsocamenta; Moser, 1924
- Species: T. kapiriana

Binomial name
- Tarsocamenta kapiriana Moser, 1924

Genus of beetles

Tarsocamenta is a genus of beetle of the family Scarabaeidae. It is monotypic, being represented by the single species, Tarsocamenta kapiriana, which is found in the Democratic Republic of the Congo.

== Description ==
Adults reach a length of about 4 mm (0.16 in). They are small, dark brownish-black, somewhat dull, with tawny antennae and legs. The head is strongly punctate.
