= Hemicamenta theryi =

Scientific classification
- Kingdom: Animalia
- Phylum: Arthropoda
- Clade: Pancrustacea
- Class: Insecta
- Order: Coleoptera
- Suborder: Polyphaga
- Infraorder: Scarabaeiformia
- Family: Scarabaeidae
- Genus: Hemicamenta
- Species: H. theryi

Binomial name
- Hemicamenta theryi Brenske, 1897

Species of beetle

Hemicamenta theryi is a species of beetle of the family Scarabaeidae. It is found in Sierra Leone.

== Description ==
Adults reach a length of about 8 mm (0.31 in). They brown and glossy and the upper surface is glabrous.
