= Pachycamenta =

Scientific classification
- Kingdom: Animalia
- Phylum: Arthropoda
- Clade: Pancrustacea
- Class: Insecta
- Order: Coleoptera
- Suborder: Polyphaga
- Infraorder: Scarabaeiformia
- Family: Scarabaeidae
- Subfamily: Sericinae
- Tribe: Ablaberini
- Genus: Pachycamenta; Brenske, 1895
- Species: P. gestroi

Binomial name
- Pachycamenta gestroi Brenske, 1895

Genus of beetles

Pachycamenta is a genus of beetle of the family Scarabaeidae. It is monotypic, being represented by the single species, Pachycamenta gestroi, which is found in Ethiopia.

== Description ==
Adults reach a length of about 9 mm (0.35 in). The clypeus is fairly densely punctate and covered with short hairs and the frons is coarsely, granularly punctate with short, backward-directed brown hairs, and the eyes are large. The pronotum is narrow and widest in the middle, with rounded hind angles and acute front angles. The surface is very glossy and sparsely punctate. The scutellum is short and rounded. The elytra are narrow, strongly punctate, and rugose, with narrow, faint ridges. The pygidium is somewhat round, with fine, dull punctation. The abdomen is smooth in the center and extremely finely punctate at the sides, with a distinct row of setae across the middle of the segments.

== Etymology ==
The species is named in honour of the Italian entomologist Raffaello Gestro.
