= Empecamenta methneri =

Scientific classification
- Kingdom: Animalia
- Phylum: Arthropoda
- Clade: Pancrustacea
- Class: Insecta
- Order: Coleoptera
- Suborder: Polyphaga
- Infraorder: Scarabaeiformia
- Family: Scarabaeidae
- Genus: Empecamenta
- Species: E. methneri

Binomial name
- Empecamenta methneri Moser, 1924

Species of beetle

Empecamenta methneri is a species of beetle of the family Scarabaeidae. It is found in eastern Africa.

== Description ==
Adults reach a length of about 9 mm. They have an oblong-oval, chestnut-brown, shiny body. They are densely covered with tawny hairs. The antennae are reddish-yellow.
