= Pentecamenta =

Scientific classification
- Kingdom: Animalia
- Phylum: Arthropoda
- Class: Insecta
- Order: Coleoptera
- Suborder: Polyphaga
- Infraorder: Scarabaeiformia
- Family: Scarabaeidae
- Subfamily: Sericinae
- Tribe: Ablaberini
- Genus: Pentecamenta; Brenske, 1896

Genus of leaf beetles

Pentecamenta is a genus of beetles belonging to the family Scarabaeidae.

== Species ==
- Pentecamenta alluaudi Burgeon, 1946
- Pentecamenta salaama Brenske, 1896
- Pentecamenta subcostata Kolbe, 1913
