= Empecamenta arabica =

Scientific classification
- Kingdom: Animalia
- Phylum: Arthropoda
- Clade: Pancrustacea
- Class: Insecta
- Order: Coleoptera
- Suborder: Polyphaga
- Infraorder: Scarabaeiformia
- Family: Scarabaeidae
- Genus: Empecamenta
- Species: E. arabica

Binomial name
- Empecamenta arabica Ahrens, 2000

Species of beetle

Empecamenta arabica is a species of beetle of the family Scarabaeidae. It is found in Saudi Arabia.

== Description ==
Adults reach a length of about 8.5–9.7 mm. They have a reddish-brown, oblong body. The dorsal surface is shiny and has long, moderately dense hairs.
