= Hemicamenta jokona =

Scientific classification
- Kingdom: Animalia
- Phylum: Arthropoda
- Clade: Pancrustacea
- Class: Insecta
- Order: Coleoptera
- Suborder: Polyphaga
- Infraorder: Scarabaeiformia
- Family: Scarabaeidae
- Genus: Hemicamenta
- Species: H. jokona

Binomial name
- Hemicamenta jokona Moser, 1917

Species of beetle

Hemicamenta jokona is a species of beetle of the family Scarabaeidae. It is found in Cameroon.

== Description ==
Adults reach a length of about 10–11 mm. They are yellow or yellowish-brown and shiny. The head is moderately densely covered with rather fine punctures and the antennae are yellow. The pronotum is rather densely and finely punctured and the elytra are densely punctured.
