= Diplotropis (beetle) =

Scientific classification
- Kingdom: Animalia
- Phylum: Arthropoda
- Class: Insecta
- Order: Coleoptera
- Suborder: Polyphaga
- Infraorder: Scarabaeiformia
- Family: Scarabaeidae
- Subfamily: Sericinae
- Tribe: Ablaberini
- Genus: Diplotropis; Boheman, 1857

Genus of leaf beetles

Diplotropis is a genus of beetles belonging to the family Scarabaeidae.

== Species ==
- Diplotropis castanea Fåhraeus, 1857
- Diplotropis nigrina Fåhraeus, 1857
- Diplotropis rufina Fåhraeus, 1857
