= Balbera matilei =

Scientific classification
- Kingdom: Animalia
- Phylum: Arthropoda
- Class: Insecta
- Order: Coleoptera
- Suborder: Polyphaga
- Infraorder: Scarabaeiformia
- Family: Scarabaeidae
- Genus: Balbera
- Species: B. matilei

Binomial name
- Balbera matilei Lacroix, 1994

Species of beetle

Balbera matilei is a species of beetle of the family Scarabaeidae. It is found on the Comoros.

== Description ==
Adults reach a length of about 5–6 mm. The upper surface of the body is variable, more or less uniform brown.
