= Gamka minuta =

Scientific classification
- Kingdom: Animalia
- Phylum: Arthropoda
- Clade: Pancrustacea
- Class: Insecta
- Order: Coleoptera
- Suborder: Polyphaga
- Infraorder: Scarabaeiformia
- Family: Scarabaeidae
- Subfamily: Sericinae
- Tribe: Ablaberini
- Genus: Gamka; Péringuey, 1904
- Species: G. minuta

Binomial name
- Gamka minuta Péringuey, 1904

Genus of beetles

Gamka is a genus of beetle of the family Scarabaeidae. It is monotypic, being represented by the single species, Gamka minuta, which is found in South Africa (Northern Cape).

== Description ==
Adults reach a length of about 5.5 mm. The head, prothorax, and under side are reddish-brown, while the elytra are pale testaceous, almost stramineous, with the suture narrowly infuscate. The antennae are dark chestnut. The surface of the head is deeply pitted and has scattered, upright, flavescent hairs. The prothorax has a lateral fringe of long, bristle-like hairs and is deeply and somewhat roughly punctate, the punctures being separated in the median part by an interval equal to their diameter. The scutellum is brownish and the elytra are very faintly bi-costulate on each side near the suture, coarsely punctate, and with a lateral marginal fringe of equi-distant hairs extending to two-thirds of the length.
