= Archocamenta ascendens =

Scientific classification
- Kingdom: Animalia
- Phylum: Arthropoda
- Clade: Pancrustacea
- Class: Insecta
- Order: Coleoptera
- Suborder: Polyphaga
- Infraorder: Scarabaeiformia
- Family: Scarabaeidae
- Genus: Archocamenta
- Species: A. ascendens

Binomial name
- Archocamenta ascendens Kolbe, 1910

Species of beetle

Archocamenta ascendens is a species of beetle of the family Scarabaeidae. It is found in Tanzania.

== Description ==
Adults reach a length of about 8.5 mm (0.33 in). They have an elongate, shining, brown body. They are sparsely covered with reddish hairs beneath and on the sides.
