= Melanocamenta flabellata =

Scientific classification
- Kingdom: Animalia
- Phylum: Arthropoda
- Clade: Pancrustacea
- Class: Insecta
- Order: Coleoptera
- Suborder: Polyphaga
- Infraorder: Scarabaeiformia
- Family: Scarabaeidae
- Genus: Melanocamenta
- Species: M. flabellata

Binomial name
- Melanocamenta flabellata Moser, 1919

Species of beetle

Melanocamenta flabellata is a species of beetle of the family Scarabaeidae. It is found in Tanzania.

== Description ==
Adults reach a length of about 6–7 mm. They are black, but the pygidium is red in the anterior half and the antennae are yellowish-brown. The pronotum is similarly shaped to that of Melanocamenta variolosa and rather densely punctate. The scutellum is smooth or with a few fine punctures. The sculpture of the elytra is somewhat coarser than in variolosa. The pygidium is moderately densely punctate, with erect hairs in front of the posterior margin. The underside is extensively dotted and covered with grey hairs.
