= Empecamenta litoralis =

Scientific classification
- Kingdom: Animalia
- Phylum: Arthropoda
- Clade: Pancrustacea
- Class: Insecta
- Order: Coleoptera
- Suborder: Polyphaga
- Infraorder: Scarabaeiformia
- Family: Scarabaeidae
- Genus: Empecamenta
- Species: E. litoralis

Binomial name
- Empecamenta litoralis Moser, 1917

Species of beetle

Empecamenta litoralis is a species of beetle of the family Scarabaeidae. It is found in Ivory Coast.

== Description ==
Adults reach a length of about 9 mm. The head and underside are widely punctate. The punctures on the head with erect hairs. The antennae are yellow. The pronotum is fairly densely punctate, the punctures with erect hairs. The elytra are also fairly densely punctate and some of the punctures have erect, bristle-like hairs.
