= Melanocamenta variipennis =

Scientific classification
- Kingdom: Animalia
- Phylum: Arthropoda
- Clade: Pancrustacea
- Class: Insecta
- Order: Coleoptera
- Suborder: Polyphaga
- Infraorder: Scarabaeiformia
- Family: Scarabaeidae
- Genus: Melanocamenta
- Species: M. variipennis

Binomial name
- Melanocamenta variipennis Moser, 1924

Species of beetle

Melanocamenta variipennis is a species of beetle of the family Scarabaeidae. It is found in the Democratic Republic of the Congo.

== Description ==
Adults reach a length of about 6 mm (0.24 in). They are black and shining, with the elytra sometimes reddish. The antennae are reddish-yellow. The pronotum is fairly densely punctured and the scutellum is almost smooth. The elytra are somewhat rugose-punctate, with indistinct ridges and the pygidium is moderately closely punctured.
