= Hemicamenta dubiosa =

Scientific classification
- Kingdom: Animalia
- Phylum: Arthropoda
- Clade: Pancrustacea
- Class: Insecta
- Order: Coleoptera
- Suborder: Polyphaga
- Infraorder: Scarabaeiformia
- Family: Scarabaeidae
- Genus: Hemicamenta
- Species: H. dubiosa

Binomial name
- Hemicamenta dubiosa Kolbe, 1914

Species of beetle

Hemicamenta dubiosa is a species of beetle of the family Scarabaeidae. It is found in Tanzania.

== Description ==
Adults reach a length of about 7–8 mm (0.28–0.31 in). They have an elongated, yellowish-brown, moderately shiny body. There are quite long yellow cilia laterally. The underside is shiny. The head is brown, the pronotum reddish-brown and the margins of the elytra brownish.
