= Empecamenta umbugwensis =

Scientific classification
- Kingdom: Animalia
- Phylum: Arthropoda
- Clade: Pancrustacea
- Class: Insecta
- Order: Coleoptera
- Suborder: Polyphaga
- Infraorder: Scarabaeiformia
- Family: Scarabaeidae
- Genus: Empecamenta
- Species: E. umbugwensis

Binomial name
- Empecamenta umbugwensis Moser, 1917

Species of beetle

Empecamenta umbugwensis is a species of beetle of the family Scarabaeidae. It is found in Tanzania.

== Description ==
Adults reach a length of about 8 mm. The head is punctured, with a hairy frons. and the antennae are yellowish-brown. The pronotum is rather densely covered with strong punctures bearing erect brown hairs. The elytra are not ribbed and rather densely covered with short-haired punctures.
