= Idaecamenta =

Scientific classification
- Kingdom: Animalia
- Phylum: Arthropoda
- Class: Insecta
- Order: Coleoptera
- Suborder: Polyphaga
- Infraorder: Scarabaeiformia
- Family: Scarabaeidae
- Subfamily: Sericinae
- Tribe: Ablaberini
- Genus: Idaecamenta; Péringuey, 1904

Genus of leaf beetles

Idaecamenta is a genus of beetles belonging to the family Scarabaeidae.

== Species ==
- Idaecamenta brevipes Arrow, 1932
- Idaecamenta eugeniae Arrow, 1932
- Idaecamenta jucunda Péringuey, 1904
