= Paracamenta =

Scientific classification
- Kingdom: Animalia
- Phylum: Arthropoda
- Class: Insecta
- Order: Coleoptera
- Suborder: Polyphaga
- Infraorder: Scarabaeiformia
- Family: Scarabaeidae
- Subfamily: Sericinae
- Tribe: Ablaberini
- Genus: Paracamenta; Péringuey, 1904

Genus of leaf beetles

Paracamenta is a genus of beetles belonging to the family Scarabaeidae.

== Species ==
- Paracamenta bohemani (Brenske, 1896)
- Paracamenta calva Péringuey, 1904
- Paracamenta conspicua Péringuey, 1904
- Paracamenta lydenburgiana Péringuey, 1904
- Paracamenta suturalis Péringuey, 1904
- Paracamenta verticalis (Boheman, 1857)
