= Cyrtocamenta similis =

Scientific classification
- Kingdom: Animalia
- Phylum: Arthropoda
- Clade: Pancrustacea
- Class: Insecta
- Order: Coleoptera
- Suborder: Polyphaga
- Infraorder: Scarabaeiformia
- Family: Scarabaeidae
- Genus: Cyrtocamenta
- Species: C. similis

Binomial name
- Cyrtocamenta similis (Frey, 1968)

Synonyms
- Microcamenta similis Frey, 1968

Species of beetle

Cyrtocamenta similis is a species of beetle of the family Scarabaeidae. It is found in Kenya.

== Description ==
Adults reach a length of about 6–7 mm (0.24–0.28 in). The upper and lower sides are light reddish-brown and moderately glossy, while the antennae are yellow.
