= Paracamenta lydenburgiana =

Scientific classification
- Kingdom: Animalia
- Phylum: Arthropoda
- Class: Insecta
- Order: Coleoptera
- Suborder: Polyphaga
- Infraorder: Scarabaeiformia
- Family: Scarabaeidae
- Genus: Paracamenta
- Species: P. lydenburgiana

Binomial name
- Paracamenta lydenburgiana Péringuey, 1904

Species of beetle

Paracamenta lydenburgiana is a species of beetle of the family Scarabaeidae. It is found in South Africa (Mpumalanga).

== Description ==
Adults reach a length of about 8 mm. The head and under side are fuscous, and the prothorax is reddish. The elytra are almost straw-colour and the antennae rufescent. The prothorax has a fringe of long but not dense flavescent hairs and the elytra are cylindrical and punctate, with a lateral fringe of hairs.
