= Leribe vesca =

Scientific classification
- Kingdom: Animalia
- Phylum: Arthropoda
- Class: Insecta
- Order: Coleoptera
- Suborder: Polyphaga
- Infraorder: Scarabaeiformia
- Family: Scarabaeidae
- Subfamily: Sericinae
- Tribe: Ablaberini
- Genus: Leribe; Péringuey, 1904
- Species: L. vesca

Binomial name
- Leribe vesca Péringuey, 1904

Genus of beetles

Leribe is a genus of beetle of the family Scarabaeidae. It is monotypic, being represented by the single species, Leribe vesca, which is found in South Africa (KwaZuluNatal).

== Description ==
Adults reach a length of about 5 mm. They are black and shining, with the elytra and legs piceous-black. The head is deeply and somewhat coarsely punctured. The prothorax is fringed laterally with setae (but not pubescent along the anterior or posterior margins) and covered with deep, somewhat closely set punctures. The elytra are deeply and coarsely seriato-punctate, faintly bi- or tri-costulate in the dorsal part and glabrous (but with a fringe of long sub-fulvous setae).
