= Empecamenta mashona =

Scientific classification
- Kingdom: Animalia
- Phylum: Arthropoda
- Clade: Pancrustacea
- Class: Insecta
- Order: Coleoptera
- Suborder: Polyphaga
- Infraorder: Scarabaeiformia
- Family: Scarabaeidae
- Genus: Empecamenta
- Species: E. mashona

Binomial name
- Empecamenta mashona (Péringuey, 1904)

Synonyms
- Camenta (Empecamenta) mashona Péringuey, 1904

Species of beetle

Empecamenta mashona is a species of beetle of the family Scarabaeidae. It is found in Zimbabwe.

== Description ==
Adults reach a length of about 8-8.5 mm. They are testaceous, with the head and prothorax brick-red, moderately shining, and clothed all over with erect, somewhat densely set, long, flavescent hairs. The head and the posterior half of the clypeus are very coarsely punctate, and the anterior part is somewhat excavate. The prothorax is covered with somewhat irregular, deep, moderately closely set punctures and the scutellum is punctate in the centre. The elytra are deeply punctate and the pygidium, abdominal segments, and pectus are pubescent.
