= Brachymis =

Scientific classification
- Kingdom: Animalia
- Phylum: Arthropoda
- Clade: Pancrustacea
- Class: Insecta
- Order: Coleoptera
- Suborder: Polyphaga
- Infraorder: Scarabaeiformia
- Family: Scarabaeidae
- Subfamily: Sericinae
- Tribe: Ablaberini
- Genus: Brachymis; Thomson, 1858

Synonyms
- Apocamenta Brenske, 1903

Genus of leaf beetles

Brachymis is a genus of beetles belonging to the family Scarabaeidae.

== Species ==
- Brachymis cameruna (Brenske, 1903)
- Brachymis crinitus Brenske, 1903
- Brachymis grossa (Moser, 1914)
- Brachymis piligera (Moser, 1914)
- Brachymis pubens Thomson, 1858
- Brachymis rugifrons Moser, 1914
- Brachymis variolosa (Brenske, 1897)
- Brachymis wittei Burgeon, 1945
