= Cyrtocamenta bechynei =

Scientific classification
- Kingdom: Animalia
- Phylum: Arthropoda
- Clade: Pancrustacea
- Class: Insecta
- Order: Coleoptera
- Suborder: Polyphaga
- Infraorder: Scarabaeiformia
- Family: Scarabaeidae
- Genus: Cyrtocamenta
- Species: C. bechynei

Binomial name
- Cyrtocamenta bechynei Frey, 1976

Species of beetle

Cyrtocamenta bechynei is a species of beetle of the family Scarabaeidae. It is found in Guinea.

== Description ==
Adults reach a length of about 6–6.5 mm (0.24–0.26 in). The upper and lower surfaces are yellowish-brown and glossy with yellowish on some areas, but otherwise glabrous.
