= Empecamenta boromensis =

Scientific classification
- Kingdom: Animalia
- Phylum: Arthropoda
- Clade: Pancrustacea
- Class: Insecta
- Order: Coleoptera
- Suborder: Polyphaga
- Infraorder: Scarabaeiformia
- Family: Scarabaeidae
- Genus: Empecamenta
- Species: E. boromensis

Binomial name
- Empecamenta boromensis Brancsik, 1897

Species of beetle

Empecamenta boromensis is a species of beetle of the family Scarabaeidae. It is found in Mozambique.

== Description ==
Adults reach a length of about 6.5–7 mm. They have an elongate, yellowish body, with flavid hairs and they are roughly and densely punctate on the upper side. The antennae are testaceous and the head and prothorax are darker than the elytra.
