= Balbera =

Scientific classification
- Kingdom: Animalia
- Phylum: Arthropoda
- Class: Insecta
- Order: Coleoptera
- Suborder: Polyphaga
- Infraorder: Scarabaeiformia
- Family: Scarabaeidae
- Subfamily: Sericinae
- Tribe: Ablaberini
- Genus: Balbera; Fairmaire, 1898

Genus of leaf beetles

Balbera is a genus of beetles belonging to the family Scarabaeidae.

== Species ==
- Balbera anjouanae Lacroix, 1994
- Balbera gracilis (Fairmaire, 1868)
- Balbera matilei Lacroix, 1994
- Balbera reflexa Fairmaire, 1898
