= Cyrtocamenta flavescens =

Scientific classification
- Kingdom: Animalia
- Phylum: Arthropoda
- Clade: Pancrustacea
- Class: Insecta
- Order: Coleoptera
- Suborder: Polyphaga
- Infraorder: Scarabaeiformia
- Family: Scarabaeidae
- Genus: Cyrtocamenta
- Species: C. flavescens

Binomial name
- Cyrtocamenta flavescens Brenske, 1897

Species of beetle

Cyrtocamenta flavescens is a species of beetle of the family Scarabaeidae. It is found in Ethiopia.

== Description ==
Adults reach a length of about 6 mm (0.24 in). They are very similar to Cyrtocamenta pygmaea.
