= Empecamenta amitina =

Scientific classification
- Kingdom: Animalia
- Phylum: Arthropoda
- Clade: Pancrustacea
- Class: Insecta
- Order: Coleoptera
- Suborder: Polyphaga
- Infraorder: Scarabaeiformia
- Family: Scarabaeidae
- Genus: Empecamenta
- Species: E. amitina

Binomial name
- Empecamenta amitina (Kolbe, 1910)

Synonyms
- Isocamenta amitina Kolbe, 1910

Species of beetle

Empecamenta amitina is a species of beetle of the family Scarabaeidae. It is found in Tanzania.

== Description ==
Adults reach a length of about 7 mm (0.28 in). They are similar to Empecamenta montana, but smaller than and the hairs on the upper surface are shorter and more dense.
