= Melanocamenta bicolorata =

Scientific classification
- Kingdom: Animalia
- Phylum: Arthropoda
- Clade: Pancrustacea
- Class: Insecta
- Order: Coleoptera
- Suborder: Polyphaga
- Infraorder: Scarabaeiformia
- Family: Scarabaeidae
- Genus: Melanocamenta
- Species: M. bicolorata

Binomial name
- Melanocamenta bicolorata Moser, 1924

Species of beetle

Melanocamenta bicolorata is a species of beetle of the family Scarabaeidae. It is found in the Democratic Republic of the Congo.

== Description ==
Adults reach a length of about 5.5–6 mm (0.22–0.24 in). They are black and shining, with yellow elytra and yellowish legs. The head is finely rugose-punctate and the antennae are yellow. The pronotum is finely punctate, while the scutellum is almost smooth and the elytra are irregularly punctate, with indistinct ridges. The pygidium is rather strongly punctate.
