= Brachymis grossa =

Scientific classification
- Kingdom: Animalia
- Phylum: Arthropoda
- Clade: Pancrustacea
- Class: Insecta
- Order: Coleoptera
- Suborder: Polyphaga
- Infraorder: Scarabaeiformia
- Family: Scarabaeidae
- Genus: Brachymis
- Species: B. grossa

Binomial name
- Brachymis grossa (Moser, 1914)

Synonyms
- Apocamenta grossa Moser, 1914

Species of beetle

Brachymis grossa is a species of beetle of the family Scarabaeidae. It is found in Tanzania.

== Description ==
Adults reach a length of about 13 mm (0.51 in). They are similar to Brachymis variolosa, but considerably larger. The colouration is reddish-brown, with the head and pronotum blackish-brown. The head is wrinkled and punctate and covered with long, erect yellow hairs. The transverse keel of the clypeus is only very slightly projecting in the middle. The clypeus bears only faint punctures in front of the keel. Its anterior margin is deeply arched. The pronotum is twice as wide as it is long and somewhat wrinkled and punctate. The punctures bear erect hairs, particularly long ones in the anterior part. The lateral margins of the pronotum are weakly serrated, the posterior angles are broad, the anterior angles are short and rounded. The scutellum bears several bristle-bearing punctures. The punctures on the elytra are quite dense and covered with erect hairs and the punctation of the pygidium is either as dense as on the elytra or somewhat more sparse. The underside of the thorax is strongly punctured and hairy, while on the abdomen the punctures are somewhat weaker and more finely haired.
