= Oocamenta rufiventris =

Scientific classification
- Kingdom: Animalia
- Phylum: Arthropoda
- Class: Insecta
- Order: Coleoptera
- Suborder: Polyphaga
- Infraorder: Scarabaeiformia
- Family: Scarabaeidae
- Genus: Oocamenta
- Species: O. rufiventris

Binomial name
- Oocamenta rufiventris (Burmeister, 1855)

Synonyms
- Camenta rufiventris Burmeister, 1855

Species of beetle

Oocamenta rufiventris is a species of beetle of the family Scarabaeidae. It is found in South Africa (Mpumalanga) and Zimbabwe.

== Description ==
Adults reach a length of about 5.5–7.25 mm. The head, prothorax and scutellum are black and very shining. The elytra is as black as the prothorax, or has a large basal reddish patch on each side, which often invades the whole surface. The abdomen is reddish and the pectus is piceous-red. The antennae are occasionally brownish in the male, but almost always flavescent in the female. The punctures of the whole head are moderately closely set and the prothorax is very faintly aciculate in the male, but finely punctate in the female (except in the median posterior part). The elytra have somewhat seriate rows of shallow punctures.
