= Empecamenta flavopilosa =

Scientific classification
- Kingdom: Animalia
- Phylum: Arthropoda
- Clade: Pancrustacea
- Class: Insecta
- Order: Coleoptera
- Suborder: Polyphaga
- Infraorder: Scarabaeiformia
- Family: Scarabaeidae
- Genus: Empecamenta
- Species: E. flavopilosa

Binomial name
- Empecamenta flavopilosa Moser, 1917

Species of beetle

Empecamenta flavopilosa is a species of beetle of the family Scarabaeidae. It is found in Ethiopia.

== Description ==
Adults reach a length of about 7 mm. The upper surface and the head are strongly punctate, with the punctures on the head bearing erect yellow hairs. The pronotum is moderately densely covered with strong, erect punctures, while the elytra have rather strong punctures with yellow hairs.
