= Empecamenta lobata =

Scientific classification
- Kingdom: Animalia
- Phylum: Arthropoda
- Clade: Pancrustacea
- Class: Insecta
- Order: Coleoptera
- Suborder: Polyphaga
- Infraorder: Scarabaeiformia
- Family: Scarabaeidae
- Genus: Empecamenta
- Species: E. lobata

Binomial name
- Empecamenta lobata Moser, 1924

Species of beetle

Empecamenta lobata is a species of beetle of the family Scarabaeidae. It is found in the Democratic Republic of the Congo.

== Description ==
Adults reach a length of about 8.5–9 mm (0.33–0.35 in). They are reddish-testaceous and shining. The head is rugose-punctate, with setiferous punctures and reddish-yellow antennae. The prothorax is moderately closely punctate and clothed with hairs, while the elytra are slightly rugose, unevenly punctate, with setiferous punctures. The pygidium is rather densely and strongly punctate, with the punctures bearing erect hairs.
