= Hemicamenta =

Scientific classification
- Kingdom: Animalia
- Phylum: Arthropoda
- Class: Insecta
- Order: Coleoptera
- Suborder: Polyphaga
- Infraorder: Scarabaeiformia
- Family: Scarabaeidae
- Subfamily: Sericinae
- Tribe: Ablaberini
- Genus: Hemicamenta; Brenske, 1897

Genus of leaf beetles

Hemicamenta is a genus of beetles belonging to the family Scarabaeidae.

== Species ==
- Hemicamenta caffrina (Péringuey, 1904)
- Hemicamenta dubiosa Kolbe, 1914
- Hemicamenta jokona Moser, 1917
- Hemicamenta theryi Brenske, 1897
- Hemicamenta tumida (Péringuey, 1904)
