= Cyrtocamenta fortipes =

Scientific classification
- Kingdom: Animalia
- Phylum: Arthropoda
- Clade: Pancrustacea
- Class: Insecta
- Order: Coleoptera
- Suborder: Polyphaga
- Infraorder: Scarabaeiformia
- Family: Scarabaeidae
- Genus: Cyrtocamenta
- Species: C. fortipes

Binomial name
- Cyrtocamenta fortipes Burgeon, 1945

Species of beetle

Cyrtocamenta fortipes is a species of beetle of the family Scarabaeidae. It is found in the Democratic Republic of the Congo.
