= Pachychilecamenta =

Scientific classification
- Kingdom: Animalia
- Phylum: Arthropoda
- Clade: Pancrustacea
- Class: Insecta
- Order: Coleoptera
- Suborder: Polyphaga
- Infraorder: Scarabaeiformia
- Family: Scarabaeidae
- Subfamily: Sericinae
- Tribe: Ablaberini
- Genus: Pachychilecamenta; Brenske, 1903
- Species: P. rufa

Binomial name
- Pachychilecamenta rufa Brenske, 1903

Genus of beetles

Pachychilecamenta is a genus of beetle of the family Scarabaeidae. It is monotypic, being represented by the single species, Pachychilecamenta rufa, which is found in the Republic of the Congo.

== Description ==
Adults reach a length of about 10 mm (0.39 in). They are shiny, with the head, pronotum, legs, and abdomen red and the elytra chestnut-brown. The pronotum is very finely punctate, while the elytra are very densely and more strongly, evenly punctate. The entire abdomen is very densely punctate and finely pubescent.
