= Empecamenta montivaga =

Scientific classification
- Kingdom: Animalia
- Phylum: Arthropoda
- Clade: Pancrustacea
- Class: Insecta
- Order: Coleoptera
- Suborder: Polyphaga
- Infraorder: Scarabaeiformia
- Family: Scarabaeidae
- Genus: Empecamenta
- Species: E. montivaga

Binomial name
- Empecamenta montivaga Moser, 1917

Species of beetle

Empecamenta montivaga is a species of beetle of the family Scarabaeidae. It is found in Tanzania.

== Description ==
Adults reach a length of about 12 mm. They are reddish-brown and shiny. The head is punctured (the punctures are hairy) and the antennae are yellowish-brown. The pronotum is densely punctured. All punctures are hairy. The elytra have moderately dense and rather strong punctation, and all punctures are covered with erect setae.
