= Brachymis cameruna =

Scientific classification
- Kingdom: Animalia
- Phylum: Arthropoda
- Clade: Pancrustacea
- Class: Insecta
- Order: Coleoptera
- Suborder: Polyphaga
- Infraorder: Scarabaeiformia
- Family: Scarabaeidae
- Genus: Brachymis
- Species: B. cameruna

Binomial name
- Brachymis cameruna (Brenske, 1903)

Synonyms
- Apocamenta cameruna Brenske, 1903

Species of beetle

Brachymis cameruna is a species of beetle of the family Scarabaeidae. It is found in Cameroon.

== Description ==
Adults reach a length of about 10 mm (0.39 in). The pronotum is finely and densely punctate at the base, while the anterior section bears scattered, coarse punctures that carry long, bristle-like hairs. The scutellum is smooth. The elytra are evenly and densely, rather strongly punctate. Strong setiferous punctures are present along the suture and along the lines where costae would be located. The pygidium is densely punctate and hairy, with a transverse row of strong punctures at the base.
