= Oocamenta transvaalia =

Scientific classification
- Kingdom: Animalia
- Phylum: Arthropoda
- Clade: Pancrustacea
- Class: Insecta
- Order: Coleoptera
- Suborder: Polyphaga
- Infraorder: Scarabaeiformia
- Family: Scarabaeidae
- Genus: Oocamenta
- Species: O. transvaalia

Binomial name
- Oocamenta transvaalia Péringuey, 1904

Species of beetle

Oocamenta transvaalia is a species of beetle of the family Scarabaeidae. It is found in South Africa (Gauteng, Mpumalanga).

== Description ==
Adults reach a length of about 6.5 mm. They are black, with the abdomen red, piceous-red or testaceous-red. The elytra are often testaceous and more or less broadly infuscate laterally. The antennae are flavous in both sexes.
