= Ablaberini =

Scientific classification
- Kingdom: Animalia
- Phylum: Arthropoda
- Clade: Pancrustacea
- Class: Insecta
- Order: Coleoptera
- Suborder: Polyphaga
- Infraorder: Scarabaeiformia
- Family: Scarabaeidae
- Subfamily: Sericinae
- Tribe: Ablaberini; Blanchard, 1850

Synonyms
- Camentini Machatschke, 1959; Ablaberidae Burmeister, 1855

Tribe of beetles

Ablaberini is a tribe of scarab beetles in the family Scarabaeidae.

== Genera ==
The following genera are recognised in the tribe Ablaberini:

- Ablabera Dejean, 1833
- Archocamenta Brenske, 1895
- Balbera Fairmaire, 1898
- Brachymis Thomson, 1858
- Camenta Erichson, 1847
- Cyrtocamenta Brenske, 1897
- Diplotropis Boheman, 1857
- Empecamenta Brenske, 1895
- Eucamenta Péringuey, 1904
- Gamka Péringuey, 1904
- Hemicamenta Brenske, 1897
- Hybocamenta Brenske, 1898
- Idaecamenta Péringuey, 1904
- Leribe Péringuey, 1904
- Makalaka Péringuey, 1908
- Melanocamenta Brenske, 1899
- Mitracamenta Brenske, 1903
- Neocamenta Burgeon, 1945
- Oocamenta Péringuey, 1904
- Pachycamenta Brenske, 1895
- Pachychilecamenta Brenske, 1903
- Paracamenta Péringuey, 1904
- Pentecamenta Brenske, 1896
- Pericamenta Péringuey, 1904
- Phyllocamenta Moser, 1918
- Plesiocamenta Lacroix & Montreuil, 2019
- Tarsocamenta Moser, 1924
- Tulbaghia Péringuey, 1904
