= Diplotropis castanea =

Scientific classification
- Kingdom: Animalia
- Phylum: Arthropoda
- Class: Insecta
- Order: Coleoptera
- Suborder: Polyphaga
- Infraorder: Scarabaeiformia
- Family: Scarabaeidae
- Genus: Diplotropis
- Species: D. castanea

Binomial name
- Diplotropis castanea Fåhraeus, 1857

Species of beetle

Diplotropis castanea is a species of beetle of the family Scarabaeidae. It is found in South Africa (KwaZulu-Natal).

== Description ==
Adults reach a length of about 8 mm. The head and prothorax are piceous, while the elytra are piceous but occasionally turning to dark brown. The antennae are reddish. The prothorax and elytra have a fringe of spaced, seriate hairs, the former is deeply but not closely punctured, the punctures are much deeper and slightly more closely set on the elytra, the pygidium, abdomen, and pectus are pubescent.
