= Empecamenta pilifera =

Scientific classification
- Kingdom: Animalia
- Phylum: Arthropoda
- Clade: Pancrustacea
- Class: Insecta
- Order: Coleoptera
- Suborder: Polyphaga
- Infraorder: Scarabaeiformia
- Family: Scarabaeidae
- Genus: Empecamenta
- Species: E. pilifera

Binomial name
- Empecamenta pilifera Brenske, 1895

Species of beetle

Empecamenta pilifera is a species of beetle of the family Scarabaeidae. It is found in Ethiopia.

== Description ==
Adults reach a length of about 7 mm (0.28 in). They have an oval, shining, reddish-brown body. The thorax and elytra are densely punctate and clothed throughout with short hairs.
