= Tulbaghia cereris =

Scientific classification
- Kingdom: Animalia
- Phylum: Arthropoda
- Class: Insecta
- Order: Coleoptera
- Suborder: Polyphaga
- Infraorder: Scarabaeiformia
- Family: Scarabaeidae
- Genus: Tulbaghia
- Species: T. cereris

Binomial name
- Tulbaghia cereris Péringuey, 1904

Species of beetle

Tulbaghia cereris is a species of beetle of the family Scarabaeidae. It is found in South Africa (Western Cape).

== Description ==
Adults reach a length of about 6.5 mm. They are pale testaceous, with the head slightly infuscate, the clypeus and prothorax reddish and the antennae flavescent. The prothorax is moderately closely punctate and fringed with long, remote hairs. The elytra are deeply punctate and the under side is rufescent and pubescent.
