= Melanocamenta =

Scientific classification
- Kingdom: Animalia
- Phylum: Arthropoda
- Class: Insecta
- Order: Coleoptera
- Suborder: Polyphaga
- Infraorder: Scarabaeiformia
- Family: Scarabaeidae
- Subfamily: Sericinae
- Tribe: Ablaberini
- Genus: Melanocamenta; Brenske, 1899

Genus of leaf beetles

Melanocamenta is a genus of beetles belonging to the family Scarabaeidae.

== Species ==
- Melanocamenta angolensis Moser, 1920
- Melanocamenta aruschana Moser, 1919
- Melanocamenta bicolorata Moser, 1924
- Melanocamenta bomuana Brenske, 1899
- Melanocamenta densata Kolbe, 1914
- Melanocamenta flabellata Moser, 1919
- Melanocamenta inflata Moser, 1914
- Melanocamenta kigonserana Moser, 1919
- Melanocamenta kolbei Brenske, 1903
- Melanocamenta reflexa (Fabricius, 1781)
- Melanocamenta rufina Brenske, 1903
- Melanocamenta rufocastanea (Moser, 1924)
- Melanocamenta sibutensis Moser, 1919
- Melanocamenta uvinsana Kolbe, 1914
- Melanocamenta variipennis Moser, 1924
- Melanocamenta variolosa Kolbe, 1913
