= Empecamenta sierraeleonis =

Scientific classification
- Kingdom: Animalia
- Phylum: Arthropoda
- Clade: Pancrustacea
- Class: Insecta
- Order: Coleoptera
- Suborder: Polyphaga
- Infraorder: Scarabaeiformia
- Family: Scarabaeidae
- Genus: Empecamenta
- Species: E. sierraeleonis

Binomial name
- Empecamenta sierraeleonis Brenske, 1897

Species of beetle

Empecamenta sierraeleonis is a species of beetle of the family Scarabaeidae. It is found in Sierra Leone.

== Description ==
Adults reach a length of about 10.5 mm (0.41 in).
