= Empecamenta bredoi =

Scientific classification
- Kingdom: Animalia
- Phylum: Arthropoda
- Clade: Pancrustacea
- Class: Insecta
- Order: Coleoptera
- Suborder: Polyphaga
- Infraorder: Scarabaeiformia
- Family: Scarabaeidae
- Genus: Empecamenta
- Species: E. bredoi

Binomial name
- Empecamenta bredoi Burgeon, 1945

Species of beetle

Empecamenta bredoi is a species of beetle of the family Scarabaeidae. It is found in the Democratic Republic of the Congo.
