= Empecamenta nairobiensis =

Scientific classification
- Kingdom: Animalia
- Phylum: Arthropoda
- Clade: Pancrustacea
- Class: Insecta
- Order: Coleoptera
- Suborder: Polyphaga
- Infraorder: Scarabaeiformia
- Family: Scarabaeidae
- Genus: Empecamenta
- Species: E. nairobiensis

Binomial name
- Empecamenta nairobiensis Moser, 1922

Species of beetle

Empecamenta nairobiensis is a species of beetle of the family Scarabaeidae. It is found in Kenya.

== Description ==
Adults reach a length of about 6–8 mm (0.24–0.31 in). They have an oblong-oval, blackish-brown, shining body. They are strongly and rather densely punctate above, with the punctures bearing greyish hairs. The 10-segmented antennae are testaceous, with a black club.
