= Cyrtocamenta transvaalensis =

Scientific classification
- Kingdom: Animalia
- Phylum: Arthropoda
- Clade: Pancrustacea
- Class: Insecta
- Order: Coleoptera
- Suborder: Polyphaga
- Infraorder: Scarabaeiformia
- Family: Scarabaeidae
- Genus: Cyrtocamenta
- Species: C. transvaalensis

Binomial name
- Cyrtocamenta transvaalensis (Brenske, 1898)

Synonyms
- Microcamenta transvaalensis Brenske, 1898

Species of beetle

Cyrtocamenta transvaalensis is a species of beetle of the family Scarabaeidae. It is found in South Africa (Gauteng).

== Description ==
Adults reach a length of about 5 mm. They are piceous, with the elytra very dark chestnut-brown and the antennae chestnut-brown. The head and clypeus deeply and somewhat closely punctured. The prothorax has a lateral fringe of hairs and the surface is moderately deeply punctulate. The elytra are more deeply punctured than the prothorax. The under side clothed with greyish moderately dense hairs.
