= Balbera reflexa =

Scientific classification
- Kingdom: Animalia
- Phylum: Arthropoda
- Clade: Pancrustacea
- Class: Insecta
- Order: Coleoptera
- Suborder: Polyphaga
- Infraorder: Scarabaeiformia
- Family: Scarabaeidae
- Genus: Balbera
- Species: B. reflexa

Binomial name
- Balbera reflexa Fairmaire, 1898

Species of beetle

Balbera reflexa is a species of beetle of the family Scarabaeidae. It is found in Madagascar.

== Description ==
Adults reach a length of about 7 mm (0.28 in). They have an oval, strongly convex, pitch-black, shining body. The elytra, underside of the body and legs chestnut brown-blackish. The antennae are pitch-black.
