= Empecamenta abyssinica =

Scientific classification
- Kingdom: Animalia
- Phylum: Arthropoda
- Clade: Pancrustacea
- Class: Insecta
- Order: Coleoptera
- Suborder: Polyphaga
- Infraorder: Scarabaeiformia
- Family: Scarabaeidae
- Genus: Empecamenta
- Species: E. abyssinica

Binomial name
- Empecamenta abyssinica Brenske, 1897

Species of beetle

Empecamenta abyssinica is a species of beetle of the family Scarabaeidae. It is found in Eritrea.

== Description ==
Adults reach a length of about 7.5–8.5 mm (0.30–0.33 in). They have an elongate-oval, shiny, reddish brown body. The upper surface is strongly punctured and has erect hairs.
