= Diplotropis nigrina =

Scientific classification
- Kingdom: Animalia
- Phylum: Arthropoda
- Class: Insecta
- Order: Coleoptera
- Suborder: Polyphaga
- Infraorder: Scarabaeiformia
- Family: Scarabaeidae
- Genus: Diplotropis
- Species: D. nigrina

Binomial name
- Diplotropis nigrina Fåhraeus, 1857

Species of beetle

Diplotropis nigrina is a species of beetle of the family Scarabaeidae. It is found in South Africa (KwaZulu-Natal, Mpumalanga).

== Description ==
Adults reach a length of about 7 mm. They are piceous, with the posterior part of the elytra reddish-brown. The antennae of the males are yellow. The prothorax is deeply but not closely punctured, fringed laterally with somewhat long, sub-fulvous hairs. The elytra are fringed laterally with long, dense hairs and are deeply punctate. The punctures are round and the intervals plane.
