= Empecamenta lindiana =

Scientific classification
- Kingdom: Animalia
- Phylum: Arthropoda
- Clade: Pancrustacea
- Class: Insecta
- Order: Coleoptera
- Suborder: Polyphaga
- Infraorder: Scarabaeiformia
- Family: Scarabaeidae
- Genus: Empecamenta
- Species: E. lindiana

Binomial name
- Empecamenta lindiana Moser, 1917

Species of beetle

Empecamenta lindiana is a species of beetle of the family Scarabaeidae. It is found in Tanzania.

== Description ==
Adults reach a length of about 7 mm. They are black, with the elytra, pygidium, tarsi, and sometimes the abdomen brown. The head is densely punctured, the punctures with yellow hairs. The antennae are yellowish-brown. The pronotum is densely punctured and has long hairs. The elytra lack ribs. The spots are quite densely packed and have short hairs.
