= Melanocamenta aruschana =

Scientific classification
- Kingdom: Animalia
- Phylum: Arthropoda
- Clade: Pancrustacea
- Class: Insecta
- Order: Coleoptera
- Suborder: Polyphaga
- Infraorder: Scarabaeiformia
- Family: Scarabaeidae
- Genus: Melanocamenta
- Species: M. aruschana

Binomial name
- Melanocamenta aruschana Moser, 1919

Species of beetle

Melanocamenta aruschana is a species of beetle of the family Scarabaeidae. It is found in Tanzania.

== Description ==
They are black with yellowish-brown antennae. They are very similar to Melanocamenta variolosa, but the frons and clypeus are more coarsely and densely punctate. The sculpture of the pronotum is the same in both species. The elytra, however, are slightly more wrinkled.
