= Empecamenta rhodesiana =

Scientific classification
- Kingdom: Animalia
- Phylum: Arthropoda
- Clade: Pancrustacea
- Class: Insecta
- Order: Coleoptera
- Suborder: Polyphaga
- Infraorder: Scarabaeiformia
- Family: Scarabaeidae
- Genus: Empecamenta
- Species: E. rhodesiana

Binomial name
- Empecamenta rhodesiana (Péringuey, 1904)

Synonyms
- Camenta (Empecamenta) rhodesiana Péringuey, 1904

Species of beetle

Empecamenta rhodesiana is a species of beetle of the family Scarabaeidae. It is found in Zimbabwe.

== Description ==
Adults reach a length of about 10 mm. They are chestnut-red, clothed on the upper side with a somewhat dense, erect, light fulvous pubescence. The anterior part of the head is ferruginous. The prothorax is somewhat deeply and closely punctured, each puncture bearing a hair. The elytra are deeply punctured, each puncture divided by a smooth space equal to their diameter and each bearing a hair.
