= Hemicamenta caffrina =

Scientific classification
- Kingdom: Animalia
- Phylum: Arthropoda
- Class: Insecta
- Order: Coleoptera
- Suborder: Polyphaga
- Infraorder: Scarabaeiformia
- Family: Scarabaeidae
- Genus: Hemicamenta
- Species: H. caffrina

Binomial name
- Hemicamenta caffrina (Péringuey, 1904)

Synonyms
- Camenta (Hemicamenta) caffrina Péringuey, 1904

Species of beetle

Hemicamenta caffrina is a species of beetle of the family Scarabaeidae. It is found in South Africa (Eastern Cape).

== Description ==
Adults reach a length of about 7.5–10.5 mm. They are red, with the head slightly infuscate in males and black in females (the prothorax of which is also infuscate laterally, but occasionally totally piceous). Males are more elongated and less convex than females, and the clypeus is more deeply incised laterally and the two anterior angles are very sharp and project also more than in females.
