= Melanocamenta kigonserana =

Scientific classification
- Kingdom: Animalia
- Phylum: Arthropoda
- Clade: Pancrustacea
- Class: Insecta
- Order: Coleoptera
- Suborder: Polyphaga
- Infraorder: Scarabaeiformia
- Family: Scarabaeidae
- Genus: Melanocamenta
- Species: M. kigonserana

Binomial name
- Melanocamenta kigonserana Moser, 1919

Species of beetle

Melanocamenta kigonserana is a species of beetle of the family Scarabaeidae. It is found in Tanzania.

== Description ==
Adults reach a length of about 5.5 mm. They are bright red, with the head, pronotum and scutellum black. The head is moderately densely punctate. The elytra are very slightly rugose, moderately densely punctate, with the costae flat. The pygidium is quite loosely punctate. Underneath the middle is sparsely punctate, while the sides are more densely punctate. The punctures are hairy.
