= Brachymis wittei =

Scientific classification
- Kingdom: Animalia
- Phylum: Arthropoda
- Clade: Pancrustacea
- Class: Insecta
- Order: Coleoptera
- Suborder: Polyphaga
- Infraorder: Scarabaeiformia
- Family: Scarabaeidae
- Genus: Brachymis
- Species: B. wittei

Binomial name
- Brachymis wittei Burgeon, 1945

Species of beetle

Brachymis wittei is a species of beetle of the family Scarabaeidae. It is found in the Democratic Republic of the Congo.
