= Empecamenta meruana =

Scientific classification
- Kingdom: Animalia
- Phylum: Arthropoda
- Clade: Pancrustacea
- Class: Insecta
- Order: Coleoptera
- Suborder: Polyphaga
- Infraorder: Scarabaeiformia
- Family: Scarabaeidae
- Genus: Empecamenta
- Species: E. meruana

Binomial name
- Empecamenta meruana Kolbe, 1910

Species of beetle

Empecamenta meruana is a species of beetle of the family Scarabaeidae. It is found in Tanzania.

== Description ==
Adults reach a length of about 9–10 mm (0.35–0.39 in). They are similar to Empecamenta usambarae. The upper surface of the prothorax is covered throughout with similarly erect setae, with a faint longitudinal impression at the rear center. The scutellum appears smooth, with a few scattered punctures anteriorly. The elytra are more sparsely and therefore less densely punctate and the pygidium is more finely punctate.
