= Makalaka rhodesiana =

Scientific classification
- Kingdom: Animalia
- Phylum: Arthropoda
- Class: Insecta
- Order: Coleoptera
- Suborder: Polyphaga
- Infraorder: Scarabaeiformia
- Family: Scarabaeidae
- Subfamily: Sericinae
- Tribe: Ablaberini
- Genus: Makalaka; Péringuey, 1904
- Species: M. rhodesiana

Binomial name
- Makalaka rhodesiana Péringuey, 1904

Genus of beetles

Makalaka is a genus of beetle of the family Scarabaeidae. It is monotypic, being represented by the single species, Makalaka rhodesiana, which is found in Zimbabwe.

== Description ==
Adults reach a length of about 5.5 mm. They are piceous black with the elytra pale straw colour, and the prothorax with a narrow, lateral marginal band of the same hue. The antennae and palps are fuscous black. The head and clypeus are closely and somewhat deeply punctate, and glabrous (except for the anterior border of the clypeus which has a fringe of erect, sub-flavescent hairs). The prothorax is covered with deep punctures separated by a smooth interval not quite as broad as their own diameter, the outer margin with a fringe of bristly hairs. The scutellum is glabrous and punctulate. The elytra are also glabrous and deeply and somewhat closely punctate, the outer margin with a fringe of pale hairs.
