= Mitracamenta =

Scientific classification
- Kingdom: Animalia
- Phylum: Arthropoda
- Class: Insecta
- Order: Coleoptera
- Suborder: Polyphaga
- Infraorder: Scarabaeiformia
- Family: Scarabaeidae
- Subfamily: Sericinae
- Tribe: Ablaberini
- Genus: Mitracamenta; Brenske, 1903

Genus of leaf beetles

Mitracamenta is a genus of beetles belonging to the family Scarabaeidae.

== Species ==
- Mitracamenta adelpha Kolbe, 1914
- Mitracamenta lineella Brenske, 1903
