= Empecamenta setulifera =

Scientific classification
- Kingdom: Animalia
- Phylum: Arthropoda
- Clade: Pancrustacea
- Class: Insecta
- Order: Coleoptera
- Suborder: Polyphaga
- Infraorder: Scarabaeiformia
- Family: Scarabaeidae
- Genus: Empecamenta
- Species: E. setulifera

Binomial name
- Empecamenta setulifera (Quedenfeldt, 1884)

Synonyms
- Camenta setulifera Quedenfeldt, 1884

Species of beetle

Empecamenta setulifera is a species of beetle of the family Scarabaeidae. It is found in Angola and the Democratic Republic of the Congo.
