= Pentecamenta alluaudi =

Scientific classification
- Kingdom: Animalia
- Phylum: Arthropoda
- Clade: Pancrustacea
- Class: Insecta
- Order: Coleoptera
- Suborder: Polyphaga
- Infraorder: Scarabaeiformia
- Family: Scarabaeidae
- Genus: Pentecamenta
- Species: P. alluaudi

Binomial name
- Pentecamenta alluaudi Burgeon, 1946

Species of beetle

Pentecamenta alluaudi is a species of scarab beetle that belongs to the family Scarabaeidae. This species is found in Kenya.
