= Empecamenta tridenticeps =

Scientific classification
- Kingdom: Animalia
- Phylum: Arthropoda
- Clade: Pancrustacea
- Class: Insecta
- Order: Coleoptera
- Suborder: Polyphaga
- Infraorder: Scarabaeiformia
- Family: Scarabaeidae
- Genus: Empecamenta
- Species: E. tridenticeps

Binomial name
- Empecamenta tridenticeps Moser, 1917

Species of beetle

Empecamenta tridenticeps is a species of beetle of the family Scarabaeidae. It is found in Angola.

== Description ==
Adults reach a length of about 8.5 mm. They are yellowish-brown, while the head and pronotum are reddish. The head is punctured, the punctures with yellow hairs. The antennae are yellowish-brown. The pronotum is moderately densely covered with punctures of unequal size. The stronger punctures with yellow setae. The elytra are rather densely covered with punctures with short, erect setae.
