= Archocamenta pilosa =

Scientific classification
- Kingdom: Animalia
- Phylum: Arthropoda
- Clade: Pancrustacea
- Class: Insecta
- Order: Coleoptera
- Suborder: Polyphaga
- Infraorder: Scarabaeiformia
- Family: Scarabaeidae
- Genus: Archocamenta
- Species: A. pilosa

Binomial name
- Archocamenta pilosa (Fåhraeus, 1857)

Synonyms
- Ablabera pilosa Fåhraeus, 1857

Species of beetle

Archocamenta pilosa is a species of beetle of the family Scarabaeidae. It is found in South Africa (Limpopo, KwaZulu-Natal) and Mozambique.

== Description ==
Adults reach a length of about 5 mm. They have an infuscate or nearly black head, the prothorax is also deeply infuscate in the anterior part, but has a broad, brick-red band near the basal part. The scutellum is black and the elytra is almost stramineous but with a lateral fuscous band. The prothorax is not deeply punctulate and fringed laterally with long, pallid, but not densely set hairs. The scutellum is feebly punctulate and the elytra are deeply punctured and somewhat coriaceous especially along the fuscous border.
