= Empecamenta densipilis =

Scientific classification
- Kingdom: Animalia
- Phylum: Arthropoda
- Clade: Pancrustacea
- Class: Insecta
- Order: Coleoptera
- Suborder: Polyphaga
- Infraorder: Scarabaeiformia
- Family: Scarabaeidae
- Genus: Empecamenta
- Species: E. densipilis

Binomial name
- Empecamenta densipilis Frey, 1962

Species of beetle

Empecamenta densipilis is a species of beetle of the family Scarabaeidae. It is found in Tanzania.

== Description ==
Adults reach a length of about 7-7.5 mm. The upper and lower surfaces are yellowish-brown, while the clypeus, frons, pronotum and elytral suture are slightly darker. The underside and legs are covered with long, pale yellow hairs. The elytra are similarly hairy, but these hairs are somewhat more sparsely distributed and shorter. The head is more finely and less densely haired, whereas the pronotum is also finely haired, but much more densely than the elytra. The hairs of the pronotum are also somewhat longer than the hairs of the elytra, but shorter than the hairs on the underside.
