= Paracamenta bohemani =

Scientific classification
- Kingdom: Animalia
- Phylum: Arthropoda
- Class: Insecta
- Order: Coleoptera
- Suborder: Polyphaga
- Infraorder: Scarabaeiformia
- Family: Scarabaeidae
- Genus: Paracamenta
- Species: P. bohemani

Binomial name
- Paracamenta bohemani (Brenske, 1897)

Synonyms
- Camenta bohemani Brenske, 1896

Species of beetle

Paracamenta bohemani is a species of beetle of the family Scarabaeidae. It is found in South Africa (KwaZulu-Natal, Eastern Cape).

== Description ==
Adults reach a length of about 12 mm. They are testaceous-red, with the head (but not the clypeus) slightly fuscous. The prothorax is fringed laterally and also on the sides of the anterior margin with long, sub-fulvous hairs, and covered with fine, round punctures separated by an interval equal to their own diameter, hairy in the basal part above the scutellum which is finely punctulate in the centre. The elytra are fringed laterally with somewhat dense long hairs and covered with deep, round punctures separated by smooth intervals slightly broader in diameter than the punctures themselves.
