= Melanocamenta rufocastanea =

Scientific classification
- Kingdom: Animalia
- Phylum: Arthropoda
- Clade: Pancrustacea
- Class: Insecta
- Order: Coleoptera
- Suborder: Polyphaga
- Infraorder: Scarabaeiformia
- Family: Scarabaeidae
- Genus: Melanocamenta
- Species: M. rufocastanea

Binomial name
- Melanocamenta rufocastanea (Moser, 1924)

Synonyms
- Camenta rufocastanea Moser, 1924

Species of beetle

Melanocamenta rufocastanea is a species of beetle of the family Scarabaeidae. It is found in the Democratic Republic of the Congo.

== Description ==
Adults reach a length of about 8 mm (0.31 in). They are chestnut brown and glossy, with the head, frons, and clypeus densely punctate and with reddish-yellow antennae. The pronotum is fairly densely punctate, while the scutellum is covered with only a few punctures. The elytra are irregularly punctate and the pygidium has ring-like punctures.
