= Empecamenta parvula =

Scientific classification
- Kingdom: Animalia
- Phylum: Arthropoda
- Clade: Pancrustacea
- Class: Insecta
- Order: Coleoptera
- Suborder: Polyphaga
- Infraorder: Scarabaeiformia
- Family: Scarabaeidae
- Genus: Empecamenta
- Species: E. parvula

Binomial name
- Empecamenta parvula Brenske, 1898

Species of beetle

Empecamenta parvula is a species of beetle of the family Scarabaeidae. It is found in Tanzania.

== Description ==
Adults reach a length of about 8 mm (0.31 in). They have a brown, shiny, pubescent, short oval body. The clypeus is very weakly indented anteriorly, indented laterally to the keel, then straight, not curved outwards, smooth from the anterior margin to the clypeus keel with a fine row of setae in front of it, from there first finely, then more coarsely setate. The frons is even more coarsely setate. The pronotum is evenly rounded at the sides, the anterior and posterior angles are distinctly rounded, the surface is covered with small, circular, flat punctures, between these are evenly spaced larger, slightly deeper, setae-bearing punctures, somewhat sparse towards the posterior. The scutellum has a few hairs in the middle. The elytra are distinctly setate, with short hairs, more distinct anteriorly and laterally. The pygidium is pointed, densely punctate, and covered with erect hairs.
