= Melanocamenta rufina =

Scientific classification
- Kingdom: Animalia
- Phylum: Arthropoda
- Clade: Pancrustacea
- Class: Insecta
- Order: Coleoptera
- Suborder: Polyphaga
- Infraorder: Scarabaeiformia
- Family: Scarabaeidae
- Genus: Melanocamenta
- Species: M. rufina

Binomial name
- Melanocamenta rufina Brenske, 1903

Species of beetle

Melanocamenta rufina is a species of beetle of the family Scarabaeidae. It is found in Tanzania.

== Description ==
Adults reach a length of about 6.5 mm (0.26 in). They have a short-oval, stout, glossy reddish-brown or yellowish-brown body, with a slightly darker head. The underside is only very sparsely hairy. They resemble Melanocamenta bomuana, but are smaller and have duller punctation. The pronotum is deeply emarginate anteriorly, with a very narrow, indistinctly defined margin. The anterior angles are distinctly obtuse, while the posterior angles are broadly rounded, and the surface is very finely and dully punctate. The elytra bear very fine rows of punctures, which are spaced slightly further apart where the costae would be. The pygidium is broad and strongly tapered, with a distinct longitudinal ridge before the apex.
