= Brachymis crinitus =

Scientific classification
- Kingdom: Animalia
- Phylum: Arthropoda
- Clade: Pancrustacea
- Class: Insecta
- Order: Coleoptera
- Suborder: Polyphaga
- Infraorder: Scarabaeiformia
- Family: Scarabaeidae
- Genus: Brachymis
- Species: B. crinitus

Binomial name
- Brachymis crinitus Brenske, 1903

Species of beetle

Brachymis crinitus is a species of beetle of the family Scarabaeidae. It is found in Cameroon.

== Description ==
Adults reach a length of about 8–10 mm (0.31–0.39 in). The pronotum is fairly densely punctate and clothed with erect hairs, and lacks distinct longitudinal bands. The pygidium is finely punctate and also bears erect hairs.
