= Empecamenta microphylla =

Scientific classification
- Kingdom: Animalia
- Phylum: Arthropoda
- Clade: Pancrustacea
- Class: Insecta
- Order: Coleoptera
- Suborder: Polyphaga
- Infraorder: Scarabaeiformia
- Family: Scarabaeidae
- Genus: Empecamenta
- Species: E. microphylla

Binomial name
- Empecamenta microphylla Moser, 1917

Species of beetle

Empecamenta microphylla is a species of beetle of the family Scarabaeidae. It is found in Uganda.

== Description ==
Adults reach a length of about 7 mm. The head is punctured, the frons covered with yellow hairs. The antennae are yellowish-brown. The pronotum is moderately densely covered with punctures of unequal size, the coarser punctures with yellow hairs. The elytra lack ribs, and the moderately dense punctures are covered with short, erect hairs.
