= Empecamenta ugandana =

Scientific classification
- Kingdom: Animalia
- Phylum: Arthropoda
- Clade: Pancrustacea
- Class: Insecta
- Order: Coleoptera
- Suborder: Polyphaga
- Infraorder: Scarabaeiformia
- Family: Scarabaeidae
- Genus: Empecamenta
- Species: E. ugandana

Binomial name
- Empecamenta ugandana (Kolbe, 1914)

Synonyms
- Isocamenta ugandana Kolbe, 1914

Species of beetle

Empecamenta ugandana is a species of beetle of the family Scarabaeidae. It is found in Uganda.

== Description ==
Adults reach a length of about 7–8 mm (0.28–0.31 in). They are similar to Empecamenta amitina, but may be distinguished by its less slender body, shorter pronotum with straight sides in the anterior third, and the even more slender apical tooth of the tibiae of the first pair of legs.
