= Empecamenta montana =

Scientific classification
- Kingdom: Animalia
- Phylum: Arthropoda
- Clade: Pancrustacea
- Class: Insecta
- Order: Coleoptera
- Suborder: Polyphaga
- Infraorder: Scarabaeiformia
- Family: Scarabaeidae
- Genus: Empecamenta
- Species: E. montana

Binomial name
- Empecamenta montana (Kolbe, 1910)

Synonyms
- Isocamenta montana Kolbe, 1910

Species of beetle

Empecamenta montana is a species of beetle of the family Scarabaeidae. It is found in Tanzania.

== Description ==
Adults reach a length of about 11–12 mm (0.43–0.47 in). They are similar to Empecamenta meruana in size, shape, and coloration, but clearly distinguishable by the structure of the antennae.
