= Empecamenta bennigseni =

Scientific classification
- Kingdom: Animalia
- Phylum: Arthropoda
- Clade: Pancrustacea
- Class: Insecta
- Order: Coleoptera
- Suborder: Polyphaga
- Infraorder: Scarabaeiformia
- Family: Scarabaeidae
- Genus: Empecamenta
- Species: E. bennigseni

Binomial name
- Empecamenta bennigseni Brenske, 1898

Species of beetle

Empecamenta bennigseni is a species of beetle of the family Scarabaeidae. It is found in Tanzania.

== Description ==
Adults reach a length of about 7.5–9 mm (0.30–0.35 in). They have a brown, shiny, narrow body. The pronotum is densely punctate, with short hairs and evenly rounded at the sides. The scutellum is very narrow and the elytra are somewhat more strongly punctate, with short hairs. The pygidium is very densely punctate.
