= Brachymis variolosa =

Scientific classification
- Kingdom: Animalia
- Phylum: Arthropoda
- Clade: Pancrustacea
- Class: Insecta
- Order: Coleoptera
- Suborder: Polyphaga
- Infraorder: Scarabaeiformia
- Family: Scarabaeidae
- Genus: Brachymis
- Species: B. variolosa

Binomial name
- Brachymis variolosa (Brenske, 1897)

Synonyms
- Empecamenta variolosa Brenske, 1897

Species of beetle

Brachymis variolosa is a species of beetle of the family Scarabaeidae. It is found in Ghana, the Republic of the Congo and the Democratic Republic of the Congo.

== Description ==
Adults reach a length of about 10 mm (0.39 in). They may be distinguished by the coarse, long bristle-bearing punctures on the head, on the lower part of the thorax, and on the elytra. Here the punctures are more prominent and arranged in rows.
