= Empecamenta =

Scientific classification
- Kingdom: Animalia
- Phylum: Arthropoda
- Class: Insecta
- Order: Coleoptera
- Suborder: Polyphaga
- Infraorder: Scarabaeiformia
- Family: Scarabaeidae
- Subfamily: Sericinae
- Tribe: Ablaberini
- Genus: Empecamenta; Brenske, 1895

Synonyms
- Isocamenta Kolbe, 1910

Genus of leaf beetles

Empecamenta is a genus of beetles belonging to the family Scarabaeidae.

== Species ==
- Empecamenta abyssinica Brenske, 1897
- Empecamenta amitina (Kolbe, 1910)
- Empecamenta angulata Burgeon, 1945
- Empecamenta angustata Brenske, 1898
- Empecamenta arabica Ahrens, 2000
- Empecamenta bennigseni Brenske, 1898
- Empecamenta boromensis Brancsik, 1897
- Empecamenta bredoi Burgeon, 1945
- Empecamenta buettikeri Ahrens, 2000
- Empecamenta calabarica Moser, 1921
- Empecamenta clypeata Moser, 1914
- Empecamenta collaris Moser, 1917
- Empecamenta coronata Frey, 1972
- Empecamenta crinalis Moser, 1919
- Empecamenta deheyni Burgeon, 1945
- Empecamenta densipilis Frey, 1962
- Empecamenta disparilis Moser, 1917
- Empecamenta flavopilosa Moser, 1917
- Empecamenta hirta Moser, 1917
- Empecamenta hirtella Moser, 1914
- Empecamenta impressiceps Moser, 1914
- Empecamenta insulicola Moser, 1919
- Empecamenta jeanneli Burgeon, 1946
- Empecamenta kinangopina Burgeon, 1946
- Empecamenta lindiana Moser, 1917
- Empecamenta litoralis Moser, 1917
- Empecamenta lobata Moser, 1924
- Empecamenta mashona (Péringuey, 1904)
- Empecamenta matabelena (Péringuey, 1904)
- Empecamenta meruana Kolbe, 1910
- Empecamenta methneri Moser, 1924
- Empecamenta microphylla Moser, 1917
- Empecamenta minuta Burgeon, 1945
- Empecamenta montana (Kolbe, 1910)
- Empecamenta montivaga Moser, 1917
- Empecamenta nairobiensis Moser, 1922
- Empecamenta nigra Arrow, 1902
- Empecamenta ophthalmica Burgeon, 1946
- Empecamenta parvula Brenske, 1898
- Empecamenta paucisetosa Burgeon, 1945
- Empecamenta pilifera Brenske, 1895
- Empecamenta rhodesiana (Péringuey, 1904)
- Empecamenta schubotzi (Kolbe, 1914)
- Empecamenta sequax (Kolbe, 1914)
- Empecamenta setulifera (Quedenfeldt, 1884)
- Empecamenta sierraeleonis Brenske, 1897
- Empecamenta sinuaticeps Moser, 1924
- Empecamenta tanganikana Burgeon, 1945
- Empecamenta tridenticeps Moser, 1917
- Empecamenta ugandana (Kolbe, 1914)
- Empecamenta umbugwensis Moser, 1917
- Empecamenta usambarae Brenske, 1898
- Empecamenta zambesina (Péringuey, 1904)
