= Melanocamenta kolbei =

Scientific classification
- Kingdom: Animalia
- Phylum: Arthropoda
- Clade: Pancrustacea
- Class: Insecta
- Order: Coleoptera
- Suborder: Polyphaga
- Infraorder: Scarabaeiformia
- Family: Scarabaeidae
- Genus: Melanocamenta
- Species: M. kolbei

Binomial name
- Melanocamenta kolbei Brenske, 1903

Species of beetle

Melanocamenta kolbei is a species of beetle of the family Scarabaeidae. It is found in Tanzania.

== Description ==
Adults reach a length of about 7 mm (0.28 in). They are black and shiny, with a red abdomen. The pronotum is almost smooth in the center and very finely punctate at the sides and the elytra are coarsely punctate. The pygidium lacks a longitudinal keel.
