= Empecamenta collaris =

Scientific classification
- Kingdom: Animalia
- Phylum: Arthropoda
- Clade: Pancrustacea
- Class: Insecta
- Order: Coleoptera
- Suborder: Polyphaga
- Infraorder: Scarabaeiformia
- Family: Scarabaeidae
- Genus: Empecamenta
- Species: E. collaris

Binomial name
- Empecamenta collaris Moser, 1917

Species of beetle

Empecamenta collaris is a species of beetle of the family Scarabaeidae. It is found in Cameroon and the Democratic Republic of the Congo.

== Description ==
Adults reach a length of about 11 mm. They are lighter or darker brown, with the head sometimes blackish. The head is coarsely punctate, the punctures with brown setae. The antennae are yellowish-brown. The pronotum is dull (but shiny next to the bands) and has punctures that are rather widely spaced and partly weak, partly strong. The stronger punctures, which are mainly located behind the anterior margin and next to the lateral margins, are covered with yellow hairs. The elytra are quite densely punctured and there are bristle-like yellow hairs arranged in rows, particularly along the lateral margins.
