= Melanocamenta uvinsana =

Scientific classification
- Kingdom: Animalia
- Phylum: Arthropoda
- Clade: Pancrustacea
- Class: Insecta
- Order: Coleoptera
- Suborder: Polyphaga
- Infraorder: Scarabaeiformia
- Family: Scarabaeidae
- Genus: Melanocamenta
- Species: M. uvinsana

Binomial name
- Melanocamenta uvinsana Kolbe, 1914

Synonyms
- Melanocamenta uvinsana ruficollis Burgeon, 1945; Melanocamenta uvinsana basalis Kolbe, 1914; Melanocamenta uvinsana nigra Kolbe, 1914

Species of beetle

Melanocamenta uvinsana is a species of beetle of the family Scarabaeidae. It is found in the Democratic Republic of the Congo and Tanzania.

== Description ==
Adults reach a length of about 4–6.5 mm (0.16–0.26 in). They have a short, yellowish-brown to brown or dark brown body, with the head black, the pronotum black with brown spots and the elytra reddish-brown, but blackish at the outer margins and posteriorly. The thorax is blackish-brown and the abdomen is dark brown, but reddish-brown at the margins. The legs are light brown and more or less blackened. Other specimens may be almost entirely black or blackish-brown, with the pygidium and sides of the abdomen brown, the antennae reddish-yellow, and the legs reddish-brown.
