= Paracamenta verticalis =

Scientific classification
- Kingdom: Animalia
- Phylum: Arthropoda
- Class: Insecta
- Order: Coleoptera
- Suborder: Polyphaga
- Infraorder: Scarabaeiformia
- Family: Scarabaeidae
- Genus: Paracamenta
- Species: P. verticalis

Binomial name
- Paracamenta verticalis (Boheman, 1857)

Synonyms
- Ablabera verticalis Boheman, 1857

Species of beetle

Paracamenta verticalis is a species of beetle of the family Scarabaeidae. It is found in South Africa (Mpumalanga, Limpopo).

== Description ==
Adults reach a length of about 7.5 mm. They are brick-red, somewhat shining and fringed along the prothorax and the elytra with very long, dense flavescent hairs. The abdomen and femora are hairy, and the pectus densely so.
