= Paracamenta conspicua =

Scientific classification
- Kingdom: Animalia
- Phylum: Arthropoda
- Class: Insecta
- Order: Coleoptera
- Suborder: Polyphaga
- Infraorder: Scarabaeiformia
- Family: Scarabaeidae
- Genus: Paracamenta
- Species: P. conspicua

Binomial name
- Paracamenta conspicua Péringuey, 1904

Species of beetle

Paracamenta conspicua is a species of beetle of the family Scarabaeidae. It is found in South Africa.

== Description ==
Adults reach a length of about 12 mm. They are chestnut-brown, with the head very slightly infuscate, and the palpi and antennae rufescent. The head is closely punctulate and hairless and the prothorax is finely punctured (but with the punctures separated by a smooth interval of the same width as their diameter) and fringed with long hairs. The scutellum is impunctate, while the elytra are deeply punctured and the margins fringed with dense, long hairs.
