= Cyrtocamenta sebakuensis =

Scientific classification
- Kingdom: Animalia
- Phylum: Arthropoda
- Clade: Pancrustacea
- Class: Insecta
- Order: Coleoptera
- Suborder: Polyphaga
- Infraorder: Scarabaeiformia
- Family: Scarabaeidae
- Genus: Cyrtocamenta
- Species: C. sebakuensis

Binomial name
- Cyrtocamenta sebakuensis (Péringuey, 1904)

Synonyms
- Microcamenta sebakuensis Péringuey, 1904

Species of beetle

Cyrtocamenta sebakuensis is a species of beetle of the family Scarabaeidae. It is found in Zimbabwe.

== Description ==
Adults reach a length of about 6.5–7.5 mm. They are pale testaceous, with the head slightly more rufescent. The antennae are flavous. The prothorax is somewhat densely punctured, with the lateral fringe of hairs moderately dense. The elytra are moderately deeply punctate and have a somewhat dense lateral fringe of hairs.
