= Empecamenta angustata =

Scientific classification
- Kingdom: Animalia
- Phylum: Arthropoda
- Clade: Pancrustacea
- Class: Insecta
- Order: Coleoptera
- Suborder: Polyphaga
- Infraorder: Scarabaeiformia
- Family: Scarabaeidae
- Genus: Empecamenta
- Species: E. angustata

Binomial name
- Empecamenta angustata Brenske, 1898

Species of beetle

Empecamenta angustata is a species of beetle of the family Scarabaeidae. It is found in Tanzania.

== Description ==
Adults reach a length of about 11 mm (0.43 in). They are brown and shiny. The clypeus is short, straight at the sides, and indented at the front. There is a row of setae in front of the clypeus keel. The pronotum is finely punctate, more widely spaced in the middle, the larger punctures are more conspicuously distinct and the hairs are long and thin. The elytra are finely punctate with a few coarser punctations at the base. The pygidium is somewhat more strongly punctate.
