= Empecamenta nigra =

Scientific classification
- Kingdom: Animalia
- Phylum: Arthropoda
- Clade: Pancrustacea
- Class: Insecta
- Order: Coleoptera
- Suborder: Polyphaga
- Infraorder: Scarabaeiformia
- Family: Scarabaeidae
- Genus: Empecamenta
- Species: E. nigra

Binomial name
- Empecamenta nigra Arrow, 1902

Species of beetle

Empecamenta nigra is a species of beetle of the family Scarabaeidae. It is found in the Democratic Republic of the Congo and Zimbabwe.

== Description ==
Adults reach a length of about 6.5–7 mm. They are black, shining and clothed with an erect, sub-flavescent pubescence. The tarsi is piceous and the head and clypeus are deeply and closely punctured, the latter is plainly incised laterally and narrowed thence to the anterior angles which are sharp but not projecting. The anterior, reflexed margin is slightly bi-sinuate and there is a transverse impressed line in the anterior part reaching from one end of the lateral incision to the other. The antennal club is flavescent and the prothorax is deeply punctate. The punctures are round, equi-distant, and separated by a smooth interval nearly equal in width to their own diameter. The elytra are very coarsely punctured with the intervals strongly coriaceous.
