= Mitracamenta lineella =

Scientific classification
- Kingdom: Animalia
- Phylum: Arthropoda
- Clade: Pancrustacea
- Class: Insecta
- Order: Coleoptera
- Suborder: Polyphaga
- Infraorder: Scarabaeiformia
- Family: Scarabaeidae
- Genus: Mitracamenta
- Species: M. lineella

Binomial name
- Mitracamenta lineella Brenske, 1903

Species of beetle

Mitracamenta lineella is a species of beetle of the family Scarabaeidae. It is found in Tanzania.

== Description ==
Adults reach a length of about 6 mm (0.24 in). They have a narrow, elongate-oval, black or brown body. The most striking feature is the deeply cleft clypeus, which tapers towards the front. The transverse ridge is very fine, and the punctures are distinct, without rugosity. The punctures on the frons are somewhat more widely spaced. The pronotum projects distinctly at the center of the anterior margin and the anterior angles are slightly prominent, while the sides are less rounded, and the surface is densely and moderately strongly punctured. The scutellum is narrow and semicircular. In addition to the suture, the elytra bear two smooth ridges and an indistinct one on the side. The punctures are denser and more rugose than those on the pronotum.
