= Balbera gracilis =

Scientific classification
- Kingdom: Animalia
- Phylum: Arthropoda
- Class: Insecta
- Order: Coleoptera
- Suborder: Polyphaga
- Infraorder: Scarabaeiformia
- Family: Scarabaeidae
- Genus: Balbera
- Species: B. gracilis

Binomial name
- Balbera gracilis (Fairmaire, 1868)

Synonyms
- Ablabera gracilis Fairmaire, 1868; Ablabera laevigata Fairmaire, 1868

Species of beetle

Balbera gracilis is a species of beetle of the family Scarabaeidae. It is found on the Comores.

== Description ==
Adults reach a length of about 6–7 mm. The upper surface is reddish-brown, more or less dark, sometimes with a darker forebody. The clypeus has a straight anterior margin and the sides narrow at the apex. There are a few long erect cilia along the anterior margin. The head has a strong, dense, and rough punctation. The pronotum has ciliate sides and strong punctation. The elytra have strong, closely spaced punctation.
