= Empecamenta usambarae =

Scientific classification
- Kingdom: Animalia
- Phylum: Arthropoda
- Clade: Pancrustacea
- Class: Insecta
- Order: Coleoptera
- Suborder: Polyphaga
- Infraorder: Scarabaeiformia
- Family: Scarabaeidae
- Genus: Empecamenta
- Species: E. usambarae

Binomial name
- Empecamenta usambarae Brenske, 1898

Species of beetle

Empecamenta usambarae is a species of beetle of the family Scarabaeidae. It is found in Tanzania.

== Description ==
Adults reach a length of about 12 mm (0.47 in). They are brown and shiny. The clypeus is very large, rounded laterally, slightly indented anteriorly, smooth up to the clypeus keel, then very densely and coarsely wrinkled-punctate without a frontal suture. The frons is even more coarsely punctured, with deep punctures bearing erect setae. The pronotum is evenly rounded on the sides, finely punctured, with some coarser punctures anteriorly, covered everywhere with thin, long, erect, brown hairs. The scutellum appears smooth but is extremely finely punctured. The elytra are densely and rather finely punctured. Coarser bristle-bearing punctures appear at the base. The pygidium is very finely punctured, with long, erect hairs.
