= Cyrtocamenta pygmaea =

Scientific classification
- Kingdom: Animalia
- Phylum: Arthropoda
- Clade: Pancrustacea
- Class: Insecta
- Order: Coleoptera
- Suborder: Polyphaga
- Infraorder: Scarabaeiformia
- Family: Scarabaeidae
- Genus: Cyrtocamenta
- Species: C. pygmaea

Binomial name
- Cyrtocamenta pygmaea Brenske, 1897

Species of beetle

Cyrtocamenta pygmaea is a species of beetle of the family Scarabaeidae. It is found in Senegal.

== Description ==
Adults reach a length of about 5–5.5 mm (0.20–0.22 in). They are yellowish and glossy, with a reddish head. The upper surface is glabrous.
