= Hybocamenta inops =

Scientific classification
- Kingdom: Animalia
- Phylum: Arthropoda
- Class: Insecta
- Order: Coleoptera
- Suborder: Polyphaga
- Infraorder: Scarabaeiformia
- Family: Scarabaeidae
- Genus: Hybocamenta
- Species: H. inops

Binomial name
- Hybocamenta inops (Péringuey, 1904)

Synonyms
- Camenta (Hybocamenta) inops Péringuey, 1904

Species of beetle

Hybocamenta inops is a species of beetle of the family Scarabaeidae. It is found in South Africa (KwaZulu-Natal).

== Description ==
Adults reach a length of about 6-6.5 mm. They are similar to Hybocamenta rufina and Hybocamenta simillima, but the anterior part of the in the male has no traces of a transverse keel, the punctures on both the clypeus and the head are broader and slightly deeper than in H. rufina, and the anterior part of the clypeus is not emarginate. The head is infuscate but has a reddish spot on the clypeus, the prothorax is rufescent but with an ill-defined, infuscate lateral patch, the scutellum is black and the elytra are livid brown.
