= Hybocamenta modesta =

Scientific classification
- Kingdom: Animalia
- Phylum: Arthropoda
- Class: Insecta
- Order: Coleoptera
- Suborder: Polyphaga
- Infraorder: Scarabaeiformia
- Family: Scarabaeidae
- Genus: Hybocamenta
- Species: H. modesta

Binomial name
- Hybocamenta modesta (Péringuey, 1904)

Synonyms
- Camenta (Hybocamenta) modesta Péringuey, 1904

Species of beetle

Hybocamenta modesta is a species of beetle of the family Scarabaeidae. It is found in South Africa (KwaZulu-Natal).

== Description ==
Adults reach a length of about 14-14.5 mm. They resemble Eucamenta castanea (but are slightly smaller) and Camenta innocua, but the shape of the antennal club of the male of H. modesta is diffent: the moderately long antennal club consists of six laminate joints of nearly equal length, and the fourth joint of the pedicel is plainly compressed and aculeate.
