= Eucamenta transvaalensis =

Scientific classification
- Kingdom: Animalia
- Phylum: Arthropoda
- Class: Insecta
- Order: Coleoptera
- Suborder: Polyphaga
- Infraorder: Scarabaeiformia
- Family: Scarabaeidae
- Genus: Eucamenta
- Species: E. transvaalensis

Binomial name
- Eucamenta transvaalensis (Péringuey, 1904)

Synonyms
- Camenta (Eucamenta) transvaalensis Péringuey, 1904

Species of beetle

Eucamenta transvaalensis is a species of beetle of the family Scarabaeidae. It is found in South Africa (Limpopo).

== Description ==
Adults reach a length of about 13.5 mm. The shape, colour, and sculpture is identical to those of Eucamenta castanea, from which it differs, however, in the clypeus being more rounded laterally in front. Furthermore, the clypeal keel is slightly more raised, and the inner joint of the antennal club is only half the length of the following one.
