= Camenta setosella =

Scientific classification
- Kingdom: Animalia
- Phylum: Arthropoda
- Clade: Pancrustacea
- Class: Insecta
- Order: Coleoptera
- Suborder: Polyphaga
- Infraorder: Scarabaeiformia
- Family: Scarabaeidae
- Genus: Camenta
- Species: C. setosella

Binomial name
- Camenta setosella Moser, 1914

Species of beetle

Camenta setosella is a species of beetle of the family Scarabaeidae. It is found in the Democratic Republic of the Congo.

== Description ==
Adults reach a length of about 16 mm (0.63 in). They are similar to Camenta westermanni, but slightly smaller and less glossy due to the short, erect yellow hairs on the upper surface. The head is similarly shaped to that of westermanni, and the transverse ridge behind the deeply emarginate anterior margin is marked by a row of erect setae. The punctation of the head, like that of the entire upper surface, is somewhat denser and coarser. The pronotum is more than twice as wide as it is long, the lateral margins are weakly serrated, and the slightly projecting anterior angles are rounded, not acute as in westermanni. The elytra show no trace of ribs and the pygidium is triangular with a rounded apex, convex, densely punctate, and covered with erect yellow hairs. The thorax has rather long yellow pubescence, and the abdomen shows dense punctation and erect yellow hairs.
