= Camenta schoutedeni =

Scientific classification
- Kingdom: Animalia
- Phylum: Arthropoda
- Clade: Pancrustacea
- Class: Insecta
- Order: Coleoptera
- Suborder: Polyphaga
- Infraorder: Scarabaeiformia
- Family: Scarabaeidae
- Genus: Camenta
- Species: C. schoutedeni

Binomial name
- Camenta schoutedeni Moser, 1914

Species of beetle

Camenta schoutedeni is a species of beetle of the family Scarabaeidae. It is found in the Democratic Republic of the Congo.

== Description ==
Adults reach a length of about 11–12 mm (0.43–0.47 in). They are similar in shape and colouration to Camenta longiclava, but may be immediately distinguished by its different head structure. Unlike longiclava, the clypeus is not deeply and roundly emarginate anteriorly, but rather shows a shallower, arched notch. Behind the anterior margin is a row of erect yellow setae, followed by a curved transverse keel, which, like the clypeal suture, is only very slightly raised. The head, as well as the entire upper surface except for the scutellum, is quite densely punctate. The pronotum is twice as wide as it is long and the middle of the anterior margin and the anterior angles are somewhat projecting, the lateral margins are weakly notched and covered with erect setae, and the posterior angles are rounded. The scutellum is punctate anteriorly and smooth posteriorly. The elytra show no evidence of ribs except along the sutural rib. The convex pygidium is covered with erect hairs posteriorly. The abdomen is moderately densely punctured, the thorax somewhat more densely, the punctures bearing erect yellow hairs, which are longer on the thorax than on the abdomen.
