= Hybocamenta coriacea =

Scientific classification
- Kingdom: Animalia
- Phylum: Arthropoda
- Class: Insecta
- Order: Coleoptera
- Suborder: Polyphaga
- Infraorder: Scarabaeiformia
- Family: Scarabaeidae
- Genus: Hybocamenta
- Species: H. coriacea

Binomial name
- Hybocamenta coriacea (Péringuey, 1904)

Synonyms
- Camenta (Hybocamenta) coriacea Péringuey, 1904

Species of beetle

Hybocamenta coriacea is a species of beetle of the family Scarabaeidae. It is found in South Africa (Eastern Cape).

== Description ==
Adults reach a length of about 9.5 mm. The shape is similar to Hybocamenta nigrita, but the colour is light or brown chestnut, with the head somewhat infuscate, and the punctures on the elytra are divided by irregular raised intervals, giving the elytra a very coriaceous appearance.
