= Hybocamenta unicolor =

Scientific classification
- Kingdom: Animalia
- Phylum: Arthropoda
- Class: Insecta
- Order: Coleoptera
- Suborder: Polyphaga
- Infraorder: Scarabaeiformia
- Family: Scarabaeidae
- Genus: Hybocamenta
- Species: H. unicolor

Binomial name
- Hybocamenta unicolor (Boheman, 1857)

Synonyms
- Ablabera unicolor Boheman, 1857

Species of beetle

Hybocamenta unicolor is a species of beetle of the family Scarabaeidae. It is found in South Africa (KwaZulu-Natal).

== Description ==
Adults reach a length of about 8.5 mm. They are similar to Hybocamenta rufina, but the colour is paler, and neither the head nor the scutellum are infuscate. The clypeus is plainly emarginate in front, the clypeal keel is slightly arcuate and the antennae are flavous. The punctures on the head, prothorax, and elytra are finer and more shallow, and the costules on the elytra are hardly noticeable.
