= Camenta macrophylla =

Scientific classification
- Kingdom: Animalia
- Phylum: Arthropoda
- Clade: Pancrustacea
- Class: Insecta
- Order: Coleoptera
- Suborder: Polyphaga
- Infraorder: Scarabaeiformia
- Family: Scarabaeidae
- Genus: Camenta
- Species: C. macrophylla

Binomial name
- Camenta macrophylla Moser, 1914

Species of beetle

Camenta macrophylla is a species of beetle of the family Scarabaeidae. It is found in Tanzania.

== Description ==
Adults reach a length of about 10 mm (0.39 in). They are similar to Camenta salisburiana, but differs from it in that the third antennal segment is only slightly longer than the second, whereas in salisburiana, this segment is almost twice as long as the preceding one. The colouration is reddish-brown. The head is moderately densely and rather robustly punctured and the frontal suture is somewhat thickened. The clypeus keel is distinct, straight in the middle, and slightly curved forward laterally. Anterior to the keel, the clypeus is only sparsely covered with coarse, hairy punctures. The anterior margin is shallowly emarginate. The pronotum is more than twice as wide as it is long, fairly densely punctured, with somewhat more sparse punctures in the middle. Its lateral margins are covered with erect setae and the anterior and posterior angles are obtuse and shortly rounded. The scutellum bears a few fine punctures. The elytra are weakly wrinkled and covered with strong punctures. Two indistinct ribs are present on each elytra. The pygidium is moderately densely punctured, with erect hairs towards the posterior end. The thorax is covered with yellow hairs, and the abdomen is sparsely punctured, with slightly denser punctures on the sides, bearing bristle-like hairs.
