= Hybocamenta nigriceps =

Scientific classification
- Kingdom: Animalia
- Phylum: Arthropoda
- Clade: Pancrustacea
- Class: Insecta
- Order: Coleoptera
- Suborder: Polyphaga
- Infraorder: Scarabaeiformia
- Family: Scarabaeidae
- Genus: Hybocamenta
- Species: H. nigriceps

Binomial name
- Hybocamenta nigriceps Moser, 1914

Species of beetle

Hybocamenta nigriceps is a species of beetle of the family Scarabaeidae. It is found in Tanzania.

== Description ==
Adults reach a length of about 9–10 mm (0.35–0.39 in). They are similar to Hybocamenta maritima in shape and colouration, but the head is black, and the ribs on the elytra are more prominent. The head is densely covered with strong, arched punctures. The frontal suture is deep, and the clypeus keel does not reach the lateral margins. Anterior to the clypeus keel, the clypeus is almost smooth, and the anterior margin is shallowly emarginate. The pronotum is very finely punctate, the posterior angles are rounded, and the anterior angles are somewhat projecting and right-angled. The scutellum is punctate in the middle. Each elytron has three smooth ribs, and a fourth is indicated between the second and third ribs. The intervals are moderately densely punctate. The punctures on the pygidium are not particularly dense and bear a few stray hairs. The center of the chest is almost smooth, while the sides of the chest have hairy umbilical punctures. The abdomen shows moderately dense punctures of varying thickness, with the larger ones being hairy.
