= Hybocamenta pusilla =

Scientific classification
- Kingdom: Animalia
- Phylum: Arthropoda
- Class: Insecta
- Order: Coleoptera
- Suborder: Polyphaga
- Infraorder: Scarabaeiformia
- Family: Scarabaeidae
- Genus: Hybocamenta
- Species: H. pusilla

Binomial name
- Hybocamenta pusilla (Burmeister, 1855)

Synonyms
- Camenta pusilla Burmeister, 1855; Ablabera pallidula Fåhraeus, 1857

Species of beetle

Hybocamenta pusilla is a species of beetle of the family Scarabaeidae. It is found in South Africa (KwaZulu-Natal).

== Description ==
Adults reach a length of about 5 mm. They are similar to Hybocamenta simillima, but differs from it by the plainly emarginate clypeus and the less parallel shape, this last is due to the elytra being a little ampliated laterally past the middle. The colouring is also different, the head is infuscate as in H. simillima, but the prothorax and elytra are a deeper testaceous, turning to dark chestnut-brown, or nearly black, and the punctures of the elytra are slightly deeper. The antennal club of the males is as in H. simuillima, but flavous instead of black.
