= Camenta lydenburgiana =

Scientific classification
- Kingdom: Animalia
- Phylum: Arthropoda
- Class: Insecta
- Order: Coleoptera
- Suborder: Polyphaga
- Infraorder: Scarabaeiformia
- Family: Scarabaeidae
- Genus: Camenta
- Species: C. lydenburgiana

Binomial name
- Camenta lydenburgiana Péringuey, 1904

Species of beetle

Camenta lydenburgiana is a species of beetle of the family Scarabaeidae. It is found in South Africa (Mpumalanga).

== Description ==
Adults reach a length of about 10–11 mm. They are very similar to Camenta innocua, but it is only half the size and the head and prothorax are more deeply punctured, the lateral fringe of hairs along the prothorax and the elytra is denser, the punctures on the elytra are deeper and rougher, and the costules on the dorsal part are much more prominent. Furthermore, in males the inner joint of antennal club is only half the length of the club, and shorter by one-third than the joint following.
