= Camenta rufoflava =

Scientific classification
- Kingdom: Animalia
- Phylum: Arthropoda
- Clade: Pancrustacea
- Class: Insecta
- Order: Coleoptera
- Suborder: Polyphaga
- Infraorder: Scarabaeiformia
- Family: Scarabaeidae
- Genus: Camenta
- Species: C. rufoflava

Binomial name
- Camenta rufoflava Moser, 1914

Species of beetle

Camenta rufoflava is a species of beetle of the family Scarabaeidae. It is found in Kenya and the Democratic Republic of the Congo.

== Description ==
Adults reach a length of about 14 mm (0.55 in). They are similar to Camenta salisburiana, but the structure of the head is different. The flat, backward-curving transverse keel of the clypeus is positioned midway between the bulging frontal suture and the anterior margin, whereas in salisburiana it is closer to the frontal suture. The frons is densely punctate and the clypeus somewhat more widely spaced than the frons in its posterior part. In front of the keel, the clypeus bears widely spaced, coarse, hairy punctures. The anterior margin is rather deeply emarginate. The punctation of the pronotum is rather fine and dense, with a smooth midline indistinctly visible. The lateral margins of the pronotum are weakly notched, and the posterior and anterior angles are rounded, the latter only very briefly. The scutellum bears a few weak punctures. The elytra are somewhat wrinkled, coarsely and densely punctate. Two indistinct ribs are visible on the disc of each elytron.
