= Hybocamenta consentanea =

Scientific classification
- Kingdom: Animalia
- Phylum: Arthropoda
- Clade: Pancrustacea
- Class: Insecta
- Order: Coleoptera
- Suborder: Polyphaga
- Infraorder: Scarabaeiformia
- Family: Scarabaeidae
- Genus: Hybocamenta
- Species: H. consentanea

Binomial name
- Hybocamenta consentanea (Kolbe, 1914)

Synonyms
- Liocamenta consentanea Kolbe, 1914

Species of beetle

Hybocamenta consentanea is a species of beetle of the family Scarabaeidae. It is found in the Democratic Republic of the Congo, Rwanda and Burundi.

== Description ==
Adults reach a length of about 11.5 mm (0.45 in). They are brown and shiny, with dark tips of the tibiae and tarsi. The head is moderately densely rugose-punctate, with less dense punctures on top.
