= Camenta longiclava =

Scientific classification
- Kingdom: Animalia
- Phylum: Arthropoda
- Clade: Pancrustacea
- Class: Insecta
- Order: Coleoptera
- Suborder: Polyphaga
- Infraorder: Scarabaeiformia
- Family: Scarabaeidae
- Genus: Camenta
- Species: C. longiclava

Binomial name
- Camenta longiclava Brenske, 1897

Species of beetle

Camenta longiclava is a species of beetle of the family Scarabaeidae. It is found in the Democratic Republic of the Congo and Sierra Leone.

== Description ==
Adults reach a length of about 11.5 mm (0.45 in). They are similar to Camenta westermanni, but significantly smaller.
