= Camenta excisa =

Scientific classification
- Kingdom: Animalia
- Phylum: Arthropoda
- Class: Insecta
- Order: Coleoptera
- Suborder: Polyphaga
- Infraorder: Scarabaeiformia
- Family: Scarabaeidae
- Genus: Camenta
- Species: C. excisa

Binomial name
- Camenta excisa Frey, 1975

Species of beetle

Camenta excisa is a species of beetle of the family Scarabaeidae. It is found in Madagascar.

== Description ==
Adults reach a length of about 6–7 mm. The head, pronotum and scutellum are reddish-brown, the elytra and antennae are light brown and the legs are light brown and shiny. The upper surface is glabrous.
