= Camenta katangensis =

Scientific classification
- Kingdom: Animalia
- Phylum: Arthropoda
- Clade: Pancrustacea
- Class: Insecta
- Order: Coleoptera
- Suborder: Polyphaga
- Infraorder: Scarabaeiformia
- Family: Scarabaeidae
- Genus: Camenta
- Species: C. katangensis

Binomial name
- Camenta katangensis Burgeon, 1945

Species of beetle

Camenta katangensis is a species of beetle of the family Scarabaeidae. It is found in the Democratic Republic of the Congo.
