= Camenta ertli =

Scientific classification
- Kingdom: Animalia
- Phylum: Arthropoda
- Clade: Pancrustacea
- Class: Insecta
- Order: Coleoptera
- Suborder: Polyphaga
- Infraorder: Scarabaeiformia
- Family: Scarabaeidae
- Genus: Camenta
- Species: C. ertli

Binomial name
- Camenta ertli Moser, 1919

Species of beetle

Camenta ertli is a species of beetle of the family Scarabaeidae. It is found in Kenya.

== Description ==
Adults reach a length of about 8 mm. They are small and slender, with a reddish-yellow colouration. The head is a somewhat darker red and rather densely punctured. The anterior angles of the pronotum are obtusely angular and barely projecting, the posterior angles are rounded. The surface is moderately densely and finely punctured. The scutellum shows only a few punctures. The punctures of the elytra are somewhat wrinkled and the ribs are only weakly prominent. The underside is widely covered in the middle, and rather densely along the sides, with yellowish-haired punctures.
