= Camenta =

Scientific classification
- Kingdom: Animalia
- Phylum: Arthropoda
- Class: Insecta
- Order: Coleoptera
- Suborder: Polyphaga
- Infraorder: Scarabaeiformia
- Family: Scarabaeidae
- Subfamily: Sericinae
- Tribe: Ablaberini
- Genus: Camenta; Erichson, 1847

Genus of leaf beetles

Camenta is a genus of beetles belonging to the family Scarabaeidae.

== Species ==
- Camenta angolensis Moser, 1920
- Camenta antennalis Moser, 1924
- Camenta atrata Frey, 1968
- Camenta bicolor Raffray, 1877
- Camenta brevicollis Quedenfeldt, 1888
- Camenta brevipilosa Moser, 1917
- Camenta caffra (Thunberg, 1818)
- Camenta capicola Péringuey, 1904
- Camenta castaneipennis Fairmaire, 1887
- Camenta coronata Burgeon, 1945
- Camenta elongata Frey, 1960
- Camenta ertli Moser, 1919
- Camenta excisa Frey, 1975
- Camenta exsecata Frey, 1976
- Camenta fulviventris Quedenfeldt, 1884
- Camenta hintzi Aulmann, 1911
- Camenta infaceta Burmeister, 1855
- Camenta innocua (Boheman, 1857)
- Camenta kamerunensis Moser, 1914
- Camenta kapiriensis Moser, 1917
- Camenta katangensis Burgeon, 1945
- Camenta kivuensis Burgeon, 1945
- Camenta longiclava Brenske, 1897
- Camenta lurida Moser, 1917
- Camenta lydenburgiana Péringuey, 1904
- Camenta macrophylla Moser, 1914
- Camenta madecassa Frey, 1960
- Camenta magnicornis Moser, 1917
- Camenta manguensis Frey, 1968
- Camenta nigricollis Quedenfeldt, 1884
- Camenta obesa Burmeister, 1855
- Camenta puerilis Gerstaecker, 1884
- Camenta rubropilosa Raffray, 1877
- Camenta rufobrunnea Moser, 1917
- Camenta rufoflava Moser, 1914
- Camenta salisburiana Péringuey, 1904
- Camenta schoutedeni Moser, 1914
- Camenta setosella Moser, 1914
- Camenta sjoestedti Kolbe, 1910
- Camenta tinanti Burgeon, 1945
- Camenta usambarana Moser, 1917
- Camenta westermanni Harold, 1878
