= Hybocamenta congoana =

Scientific classification
- Kingdom: Animalia
- Phylum: Arthropoda
- Clade: Pancrustacea
- Class: Insecta
- Order: Coleoptera
- Suborder: Polyphaga
- Infraorder: Scarabaeiformia
- Family: Scarabaeidae
- Genus: Hybocamenta
- Species: H. congoana

Binomial name
- Hybocamenta congoana Brenske, 1898

Species of beetle

Hybocamenta congoana is a species of beetle of the family Scarabaeidae. It is found in Angola.

== Description ==
Adults reach a length of about 10 mm (0.39 in). They are dark brown and brown, with a darker head and tips of the elytra, and with the antennae lighter. They are very similar to Hybocamenta gabonensis, but narrower in body shape.
