= Camenta rufobrunnea =

Scientific classification
- Kingdom: Animalia
- Phylum: Arthropoda
- Clade: Pancrustacea
- Class: Insecta
- Order: Coleoptera
- Suborder: Polyphaga
- Infraorder: Scarabaeiformia
- Family: Scarabaeidae
- Genus: Camenta
- Species: C. rufobrunnea

Binomial name
- Camenta rufobrunnea Moser, 1917

Species of beetle

Camenta rufobrunnea is a species of beetle of the family Scarabaeidae. It is found in Uganda.

== Description ==
Adults reach a length of about 10 mm. The head is punctate, the punctures being of unequal size and the stronger punctures with setae. A smooth spot is present in the middle of the frons. The antennae are yellowish-brown. The pronotum is quite densely punctured and the elytra are punctured, with two faint ridges on each elytra.
