= Hybocamenta longiceps =

Scientific classification
- Kingdom: Animalia
- Phylum: Arthropoda
- Class: Insecta
- Order: Coleoptera
- Suborder: Polyphaga
- Infraorder: Scarabaeiformia
- Family: Scarabaeidae
- Genus: Hybocamenta
- Species: H. longiceps

Binomial name
- Hybocamenta longiceps Frey, 1975

Species of beetle

Hybocamenta longiceps is a species of beetle of the family Scarabaeidae. It is found in Tanzania.

== Description ==
Adults reach a length of about 6.5 mm. The upper and lower surfaces are yellowish-brown and shiny. The upper surface is glabrous, while the thorax and ventral segments have scattered, erect, longer setae.
