= Camenta lurida =

Scientific classification
- Kingdom: Animalia
- Phylum: Arthropoda
- Clade: Pancrustacea
- Class: Insecta
- Order: Coleoptera
- Suborder: Polyphaga
- Infraorder: Scarabaeiformia
- Family: Scarabaeidae
- Genus: Camenta
- Species: C. lurida

Binomial name
- Camenta lurida Moser, 1917

Species of beetle

Camenta lurida is a species of beetle of the family Scarabaeidae. It is found in Tanzania and the Democratic Republic of the Congo.

== Description ==
Adult specimens typically attain a body length of approximately 6.5–7 mm. They are yellowish-brown, with the head and pronotum reddish. The surface of the head is rather densely punctate, and the antennae are yellow. The pronotum is densely, and in the middle even quite extensively, covered with punctures and the elytra are punctate, each with two indistinct ribs.
