= Camenta kapiriensis =

Scientific classification
- Kingdom: Animalia
- Phylum: Arthropoda
- Clade: Pancrustacea
- Class: Insecta
- Order: Coleoptera
- Suborder: Polyphaga
- Infraorder: Scarabaeiformia
- Family: Scarabaeidae
- Genus: Camenta
- Species: C. kapiriensis

Binomial name
- Camenta kapiriensis Moser, 1917

Species of beetle

Camenta kapiriensis is a species of beetle of the family Scarabaeidae. It is found in the Democratic Republic of the Congo.

== Description ==
Adults reach a length of about 5–6 mm. The upper surface is black, with the elytra sometimes reddish-brown. The underside is black or reddish-brown. The head is densely punctured and the antennae are yellowish-brown. The pronotum is rather densely punctate, although a small indistinct median spot is sometimes unpunctate. The elytra are punctate.
