= Camenta manguensis =

Scientific classification
- Kingdom: Animalia
- Phylum: Arthropoda
- Class: Insecta
- Order: Coleoptera
- Suborder: Polyphaga
- Infraorder: Scarabaeiformia
- Family: Scarabaeidae
- Genus: Camenta
- Species: C. manguensis

Binomial name
- Camenta manguensis Frey, 1968

Species of beetle

Camenta manguensis is a species of beetle of the family Scarabaeidae. It is found in Tanzania.

== Description ==
Adults reach a length of about 11–12 mm. The upper and lower surfaces are reddish-yellow and shiny, with the pronotum somewhat lighter. The upper surface is bare, the head, pronotum and elytra with yellowish cilia and the lower surface with short, yellowish hairs on the thorax, but otherwise sparsely covered.
