= Camenta madecassa =

Scientific classification
- Kingdom: Animalia
- Phylum: Arthropoda
- Class: Insecta
- Order: Coleoptera
- Suborder: Polyphaga
- Infraorder: Scarabaeiformia
- Family: Scarabaeidae
- Genus: Camenta
- Species: C. madecassa

Binomial name
- Camenta madecassa Frey, 1960

Species of beetle

Camenta madecassa is a species of beetle of the family Scarabaeidae. It is found in Madagascar.

== Description ==
Adults reach a length of about 6-7.5 mm. The upper and lower surfaces are dark reddish-brown and somewhat mottled, while the head, pronotum and scutellum are black. The antennae are reddish-brown. The upper and lower surfaces are moderately shiny (the upper surface also smooth). The lateral margins of the pronotum and elytra have pale cilia and the thorax is rather densely covered with long pale hairs.
