= Hybocamenta discrepans =

Scientific classification
- Kingdom: Animalia
- Phylum: Arthropoda
- Clade: Pancrustacea
- Class: Insecta
- Order: Coleoptera
- Suborder: Polyphaga
- Infraorder: Scarabaeiformia
- Family: Scarabaeidae
- Genus: Hybocamenta
- Species: H. discrepans

Binomial name
- Hybocamenta discrepans (Kolbe, 1914)

Synonyms
- Empecamenta discrepans Kolbe, 1914

Species of beetle

Hybocamenta discrepans is a species of beetle of the family Scarabaeidae. It is found in Tanzania.

== Description ==
Adults reach a length of about 7.3–8 mm (0.29–0.31 in). They are reddish-yellow with erect hairs, and strong punctation on the head, pronotum and elytra.
