= Hybocamenta =

Scientific classification
- Kingdom: Animalia
- Phylum: Arthropoda
- Class: Insecta
- Order: Coleoptera
- Suborder: Polyphaga
- Infraorder: Scarabaeiformia
- Family: Scarabaeidae
- Subfamily: Sericinae
- Tribe: Ablaberini
- Genus: Hybocamenta; Brenske, 1898

Synonyms
- Liocamenta Kolbe, 1914

Genus of leaf beetles

Hybocamenta is a genus of beetles belonging to the family Scarabaeidae.

== Species ==
- Hybocamenta atriceps Moser, 1917
- Hybocamenta benitoana Brenske, 1898
- Hybocamenta brevicornis (Moser, 1914)
- Hybocamenta congoana Brenske, 1898
- Hybocamenta consentanea (Kolbe, 1914)
- Hybocamenta coriacea (Péringuey, 1904)
- Hybocamenta descarpentriesi Frey, 1966
- Hybocamenta discrepans (Kolbe, 1914)
- Hybocamenta ferranti Moser, 1917
- Hybocamenta flabellata Burgeon, 1945
- Hybocamenta gabonensis Brenske, 1898
- Hybocamenta heptaphylla Burgeon, 1945
- Hybocamenta inops (Péringuey, 1904)
- Hybocamenta kivuana Burgeon, 1945
- Hybocamenta longiceps Frey, 1975
- Hybocamenta maritima Brenske, 1898
- Hybocamenta modesta (Péringuey, 1904)
- Hybocamenta morio (Fåhraeus, 1857)
- Hybocamenta nigriceps Moser, 1914
- Hybocamenta nigrita (Blanchard, 1850)
- Hybocamenta pallidicauda Arrow, 1925
- Hybocamenta pilosella (Péringuey, 1904)
- Hybocamenta pusilla (Burmeister, 1855)
- Hybocamenta rufina (Fåhraeus, 1857)
- Hybocamenta rufopilosa Moser, 1924
- Hybocamenta saegeri Burgeon, 1945
- Hybocamenta simillima (Péringuey, 1904)
- Hybocamenta tongaatsana (Péringuey, 1904)
- Hybocamenta unicolor (Boheman, 1857)
- Hybocamenta upangwana Moser, 1917
- Hybocamenta urunguensis Moser, 1924
- Hybocamenta variabilis (Fåhraeus, 1857)
