= Camenta angolensis =

Scientific classification
- Kingdom: Animalia
- Phylum: Arthropoda
- Clade: Pancrustacea
- Class: Insecta
- Order: Coleoptera
- Suborder: Polyphaga
- Infraorder: Scarabaeiformia
- Family: Scarabaeidae
- Genus: Camenta
- Species: C. angolensis

Binomial name
- Camenta angolensis Moser, 1920

Species of beetle

Camenta angolensis is a species of beetle of the family Scarabaeidae. It is found in Angola.

== Description ==
Adults reach a length of about 7 mm. They have an oblong, reddish-yellow body, with a black head. The front is slightly impressed in the middle, sparsely punctate and with some setae. The sides of the pronotum are ciliated and the surface is moderately densely punctate.
