= Camenta atrata =

Scientific classification
- Kingdom: Animalia
- Phylum: Arthropoda
- Class: Insecta
- Order: Coleoptera
- Suborder: Polyphaga
- Infraorder: Scarabaeiformia
- Family: Scarabaeidae
- Genus: Camenta
- Species: C. atrata

Binomial name
- Camenta atrata Frey, 1968

Species of beetle

Camenta atrata is a species of beetle of the family Scarabaeidae. It is found in South Africa (Mpumalanga).

== Description ==
Adults reach a length of about 6 mm. The upper and lower surfaces are black and moderately shiny. The upper surface is smooth and the sides of the pronotum and elytra are slightly fringed with light brown hairs. The underside is sparsely covered with long hairs.
