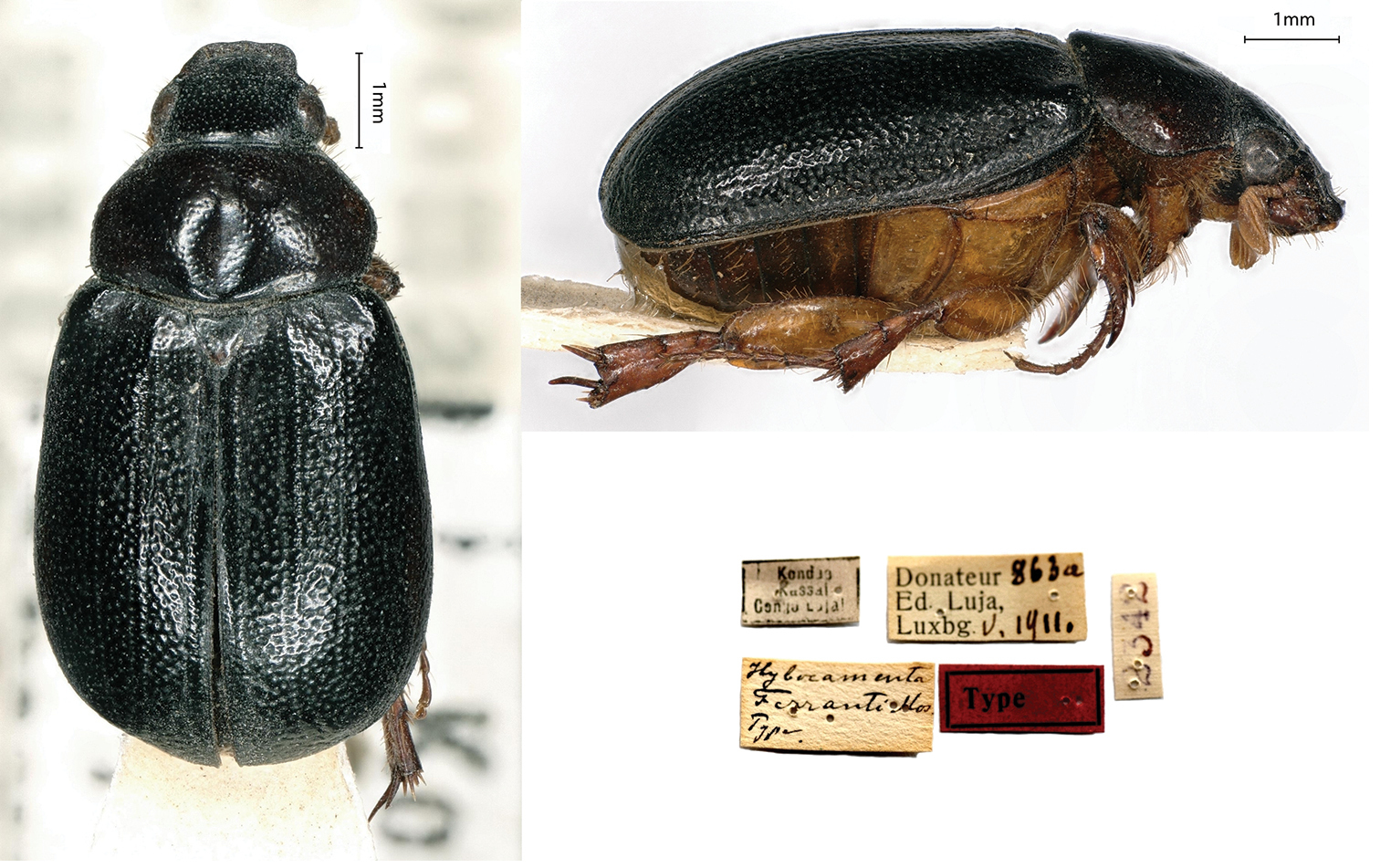

Scientific classification
- Kingdom: Animalia
- Phylum: Arthropoda
- Clade: Pancrustacea
- Class: Insecta
- Order: Coleoptera
- Suborder: Polyphaga
- Infraorder: Scarabaeiformia
- Family: Scarabaeidae
- Genus: Hybocamenta
- Species: H. ferranti

Binomial name
- Hybocamenta ferranti Moser, 1917

= Hybocamenta ferranti =

Species of beetle

Hybocamenta ferranti is a species of beetle of the family Scarabaeidae. It is found in the Democratic Republic of the Congo.

== Description ==
Adults reach a length of about 8 mm. They are shiny and black above and yellowish-brown below. The head is covered with punctures and the antennae are yellowish-brown. The pronotum is finely punctate and the elytra are punctate, with 3–4 indistinct ribs on each elytron.
