= Hybocamenta maritima =

Scientific classification
- Kingdom: Animalia
- Phylum: Arthropoda
- Clade: Pancrustacea
- Class: Insecta
- Order: Coleoptera
- Suborder: Polyphaga
- Infraorder: Scarabaeiformia
- Family: Scarabaeidae
- Genus: Hybocamenta
- Species: H. maritima

Binomial name
- Hybocamenta maritima Brenske, 1898

Species of beetle

Hybocamenta maritima is a species of beetle of the family Scarabaeidae. It is found in Tanzania.

== Description ==
Adults reach a length of about 9 mm (0.35 in). They are brown and glossy, with the elytra slightly darkened at the rear, and with a darker head. The body shape is narrow and therefore, in appearance, this species is most similar to Hybocamenta congoana.
