= Camenta exsecata =

Scientific classification
- Kingdom: Animalia
- Phylum: Arthropoda
- Clade: Pancrustacea
- Class: Insecta
- Order: Coleoptera
- Suborder: Polyphaga
- Infraorder: Scarabaeiformia
- Family: Scarabaeidae
- Genus: Camenta
- Species: C. exsecata

Binomial name
- Camenta exsecata Frey, 1976

Species of beetle

Camenta exsecata is a species of beetle of the family Scarabaeidae. It is found in Ethiopia.

== Description ==
Adults reach a length of about 8 mm (0.31 in). The upper and lower surfaces are reddish-brown and glossy. The upper surface is glabrous, while the tip of the pygidium and the underside have fine pubescence.
