= Hybocamenta rufopilosa =

Scientific classification
- Kingdom: Animalia
- Phylum: Arthropoda
- Clade: Pancrustacea
- Class: Insecta
- Order: Coleoptera
- Suborder: Polyphaga
- Infraorder: Scarabaeiformia
- Family: Scarabaeidae
- Genus: Hybocamenta
- Species: H. rufopilosa

Binomial name
- Hybocamenta rufopilosa Moser, 1924

Species of beetle

Hybocamenta rufopilosa is a species of beetle of the family Scarabaeidae. It is found in the Democratic Republic of the Congo.

== Description ==
Adults reach a length of about 10 mm (0.39 in). They are reddish-testaceous and shining, with reddish pubescence and reddish-yellow antennae.
