= Camenta elongata =

Scientific classification
- Kingdom: Animalia
- Phylum: Arthropoda
- Class: Insecta
- Order: Coleoptera
- Suborder: Polyphaga
- Infraorder: Scarabaeiformia
- Family: Scarabaeidae
- Genus: Camenta
- Species: C. elongata

Binomial name
- Camenta elongata Frey, 1960

Species of beetle

Camenta elongata is a species of beetle of the family Scarabaeidae. It is found in Madagascar.

== Description ==
Adults reach a length of about 6 mm. The upper and lower surfaces are yellowish-brown, with some dark spots on the pronotum and with the first two antennal segments and the pygidium lighter. The upper surface is smooth and the sides of the head, pronotum, elytra and underside are all covered with long, erect, light hairs.
