= Hybocamenta upangwana =

Scientific classification
- Kingdom: Animalia
- Phylum: Arthropoda
- Clade: Pancrustacea
- Class: Insecta
- Order: Coleoptera
- Suborder: Polyphaga
- Infraorder: Scarabaeiformia
- Family: Scarabaeidae
- Genus: Hybocamenta
- Species: H. upangwana

Binomial name
- Hybocamenta upangwana Moser, 1917

Species of beetle

Hybocamenta upangwana is a species of beetle of the family Scarabaeidae. It is found in Tanzania.

== Description ==
Adults reach a length of about 7.5 mm. They are reddish-brown above, while the frons and underside are blackish. The head is densely punctured and the antennae are reddish-brown. The lateral margins of the pronotum are fringed with yellow cilia, and the surface is quite densely covered with fine punctures. The elytra are rather strongly punctured.
