= Camenta brevipilosa =

Scientific classification
- Kingdom: Animalia
- Phylum: Arthropoda
- Clade: Pancrustacea
- Class: Insecta
- Order: Coleoptera
- Suborder: Polyphaga
- Infraorder: Scarabaeiformia
- Family: Scarabaeidae
- Genus: Camenta
- Species: C. brevipilosa

Binomial name
- Camenta brevipilosa Moser, 1917

Species of beetle

Camenta brevipilosa is a species of beetle of the family Scarabaeidae. It is found in the Democratic Republic of the Congo.

== Description ==
Adults reach a length of about 10 mm. They have a black head with punctures and yellowish-brown antennae. The pronotum is yellowish-brown and lighter than the elytra, which become blackish towards the posterior margin. The pronotum is densely punctured, the punctures with short, somewhat erect hairs. The elytra are covered with a puncture pattern, the punctures fringed with short, erect hairs.
