= Hybocamenta brevicornis =

Scientific classification
- Kingdom: Animalia
- Phylum: Arthropoda
- Clade: Pancrustacea
- Class: Insecta
- Order: Coleoptera
- Suborder: Polyphaga
- Infraorder: Scarabaeiformia
- Family: Scarabaeidae
- Genus: Hybocamenta
- Species: H. brevicornis

Binomial name
- Hybocamenta brevicornis (Moser, 1914)

Synonyms
- Camenta brevicornis Moser, 1914

Species of beetle

Hybocamenta brevicornis is a species of beetle of the family Scarabaeidae. It is found in Nigeria and the Democratic Republic of the Congo.

== Description ==
Adults reach a length of about 8 mm (0.31 in). The head is rather densely, weakly punctured and the clypeus is somewhat more sparsely punctured behind the transverse keel than the frons. In front of the transverse keel, it is smooth and bears a row of erect setae in the middle between the keel and the anterior margin. The anterior margin is upturned and shallowly emarginate in the middle. The antennae are yellowish-brown. The pronotum is more than twice as wide as it is long, rather densely and weakly punctured and the posterior angles are strongly rounded, the anterior angles obtuse, only very slightly projecting. The scutellum bears a few fine punctures and the elytra are slightly wrinkled, densely and rather strongly punctured. The ribs are only very faintly indicated. The punctation of the pygidium is moderately dense. On the underside, the punctures are rather widely spaced and hairy on the thorax. Besides the weaker punctures, the abdomen also has a few coarser punctures covered with setae.
