= Camenta magnicornis =

Scientific classification
- Kingdom: Animalia
- Phylum: Arthropoda
- Clade: Pancrustacea
- Class: Insecta
- Order: Coleoptera
- Suborder: Polyphaga
- Infraorder: Scarabaeiformia
- Family: Scarabaeidae
- Genus: Camenta
- Species: C. magnicornis

Binomial name
- Camenta magnicornis Moser, 1917

Species of beetle

Camenta magnicornis is a species of beetle of the family Scarabaeidae. It is found in Cameroon.

== Description ==
Adults reach a length of about 12 mm. They are reddish-brown above and yellowish-brown below. The head is quite densely punctate and the antennae are yellowish-brown. The surface of the elytra is quite densely punctate.
