= Hybocamenta pilosella =

Scientific classification
- Kingdom: Animalia
- Phylum: Arthropoda
- Class: Insecta
- Order: Coleoptera
- Suborder: Polyphaga
- Infraorder: Scarabaeiformia
- Family: Scarabaeidae
- Genus: Hybocamenta
- Species: H. pilosella

Binomial name
- Hybocamenta pilosella (Péringuey, 1904)

Synonyms
- Camenta (Hybocamenta) pilosella Péringuey, 1904

Species of beetle

Hybocamenta pilosella is a species of beetle of the family Scarabaeidae. It is found in South Africa (KwaZulu-Natal).

== Description ==
Adults reach a length of about 4.25–4.5 mm. They are black, but with the elytra deeply infuscate, and with two juxta-sutural testaceous bands in the posterior part, but extending at times from the shoulders to the apex. The whole upper surface is clothed with sub-erect, not very dense sub-flavescent hairs. The clypeus is covered like the head with deep, but somewhat scattered punctures. The prothorax is covered with similar punctures. The elytra are deeply and coarsely punctate. The antennal club of the males is long and black, like the pedicel.
