= Camenta kamerunensis =

Scientific classification
- Kingdom: Animalia
- Phylum: Arthropoda
- Clade: Pancrustacea
- Class: Insecta
- Order: Coleoptera
- Suborder: Polyphaga
- Infraorder: Scarabaeiformia
- Family: Scarabaeidae
- Genus: Camenta
- Species: C. kamerunensis

Binomial name
- Camenta kamerunensis Moser, 1914

Species of beetle

Camenta kamerunensis is a species of beetle of the family Scarabaeidae. It is found in Cameroon.

== Description ==
Adults reach a length of about 11 mm (0.43 in). They are reddish-brown, with the elytra blackish-brown at the base, and black towards the rear. The head is rather densely and weakly wrinkled-punctate, the frontal suture is distinct, weakly curved, and the clypeus keel is barely perceptibly flattened in the middle. Anterior to the keel, the clypeus is almost smooth and bears only a few setae. The anterior margin is upturned and slightly reflexed in the middle, giving it a emarginate appearance. The pronotum is more than twice as wide as it is long, not particularly densely and rather weakly punctate and the lateral margins have erect setae, the posterior angles are rounded, and the acute-angled anterior angles are projected. The scutellum shows only a few fine punctures. The elytra are moderately densely and rather coarsely punctate, each displaying four narrow, flat, smooth ridges. On the pygidium, the umbilical punctures are quite close together, with scattered, erect setae in front of the posterior margin. The thorax is moderately densely punctate, the punctures bearing hairs. On the abdomen, the punctures are somewhat more widely spaced and of unequal thickness. The stronger punctures bear erect setae.
