= Hybocamenta gabonensis =

Scientific classification
- Kingdom: Animalia
- Phylum: Arthropoda
- Clade: Pancrustacea
- Class: Insecta
- Order: Coleoptera
- Suborder: Polyphaga
- Infraorder: Scarabaeiformia
- Family: Scarabaeidae
- Genus: Hybocamenta
- Species: H. gabonensis

Binomial name
- Hybocamenta gabonensis Brenske, 1898

Species of beetle

Hybocamenta gabonensis is a species of beetle of the family Scarabaeidae. It is found in Gabon and the Democratic Republic of the Congo.

== Description ==
Adults reach a length of about 10 mm (0.39 in). They are very similar to Hybocamenta benitoana in size and body shape. They are reddish-brown with a somewhat darkened head and a similarly darker hind elytral half.
