= Camenta usambarana =

Scientific classification
- Kingdom: Animalia
- Phylum: Arthropoda
- Clade: Pancrustacea
- Class: Insecta
- Order: Coleoptera
- Suborder: Polyphaga
- Infraorder: Scarabaeiformia
- Family: Scarabaeidae
- Genus: Camenta
- Species: C. usambarana

Binomial name
- Camenta usambarana Moser, 1917

Species of beetle

Camenta usambarana is a species of beetle of the family Scarabaeidae. It is found in Tanzania.

== Description ==
Adults reach a length of about 9 mm. They are reddish-brown. The head is quite densely punctate and the antennae are yellowish-brown. The pronotum is rather sparsely punctured and the elytra are punctate, with two indistinct ribs on each elytron.
