= Hybocamenta tongaatsana =

Scientific classification
- Kingdom: Animalia
- Phylum: Arthropoda
- Class: Insecta
- Order: Coleoptera
- Suborder: Polyphaga
- Infraorder: Scarabaeiformia
- Family: Scarabaeidae
- Genus: Hybocamenta
- Species: H. tongaatsana

Binomial name
- Hybocamenta tongaatsana (Péringuey, 1904)

Synonyms
- Camenta (Hybocamenta) tongaatsana Péringuey, 1904

Species of beetle

Hybocamenta tongaatsana is a species of beetle of the family Scarabaeidae. It is found in South Africa (KwaZulu-Natal).

== Description ==
Adults reach a length of about 6.5 mm. They are piceous, with the anterior part of the clypeus and the extreme part of the elytra slightly piceous-red. The antennal club of the males is flavescent. The clypeus is emarginate in front, and covered, like the head, with very deep round punctures separated by a distinct interval. The prothorax has fairly deep and distinct punctures and the scutellum is plainly punctate. The elytra has deep punctures, with the intervals somewhat rugose.
