= Hybocamenta variabilis =

Scientific classification
- Kingdom: Animalia
- Phylum: Arthropoda
- Class: Insecta
- Order: Coleoptera
- Suborder: Polyphaga
- Infraorder: Scarabaeiformia
- Family: Scarabaeidae
- Genus: Hybocamenta
- Species: H. variabilis

Binomial name
- Hybocamenta variabilis (Fåhraeus, 1857)

Synonyms
- Ablabera variabilis Fåhraeus, 1857

Species of beetle

Hybocamenta variabilis is a species of beetle of the family Scarabaeidae. It is found in South Africa (KwaZulu-Natal).

== Description ==
Adults reach a length of about 4.75–5 mm. They are black, with the anterior legs and the elytra testaceous-red, but with the suture of the elytra and a marginal band black. The scutellum is black and the upper side is glabrous. The antennae are reddish, but with the club sub-infuscate in the male. The prothorax is covered with deep, round, non-contiguous punctures and the scutellum is punctulate. The elytra are covered with deep, sub-seriate punctures.
