= Camenta capicola =

Scientific classification
- Kingdom: Animalia
- Phylum: Arthropoda
- Class: Insecta
- Order: Coleoptera
- Suborder: Polyphaga
- Infraorder: Scarabaeiformia
- Family: Scarabaeidae
- Genus: Camenta
- Species: C. capicola

Binomial name
- Camenta capicola Péringuey, 1904

Species of beetle

Camenta capicola is a species of beetle of the family Scarabaeidae. It is found in South Africa (Western Cape).

== Description ==
Adults reach a length of about 10 mm. They are testaceous-red. The inner joint of the antennal club is less than half the length of the one following. The punctures on the head and prothorax are very shallow, but those on the elytra are deeper than in Camenta innocua, and the costules are quite plain; the scutellum is not impressed and is slightly punctulate.
