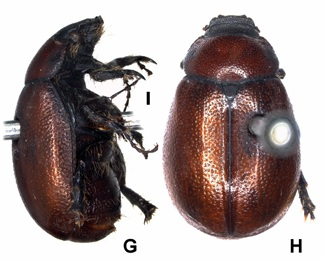

Scientific classification
- Kingdom: Animalia
- Phylum: Arthropoda
- Class: Insecta
- Order: Coleoptera
- Suborder: Polyphaga
- Infraorder: Scarabaeiformia
- Family: Scarabaeidae
- Genus: Camenta
- Species: C. caffra

Binomial name
- Camenta caffra (Thunberg, 1818)

Synonyms
- Melolontha caffra Thunberg, 1818

= Camenta caffra =

Species of beetle

Camenta caffra is a species of beetle of the family Scarabaeidae. It is found in South Africa.
