= Hybocamenta morio =

Scientific classification
- Kingdom: Animalia
- Phylum: Arthropoda
- Class: Insecta
- Order: Coleoptera
- Suborder: Polyphaga
- Infraorder: Scarabaeiformia
- Family: Scarabaeidae
- Genus: Hybocamenta
- Species: H. morio

Binomial name
- Hybocamenta morio (Fåhraeus, 1857)

Synonyms
- Ablabera morio Fåhraeus, 1857

Species of beetle

Hybocamenta morio is a species of beetle of the family Scarabaeidae. It is found in South Africa (KwaZulu-Natal, Mpumalanga, North West).

== Description ==
Adults reach a length of about 3.75–5 mm. They are black, very shining and glabrous above. The antennae are black in males and reddish (but with the club partly infuscate) in females.
