= Hybocamenta atriceps =

Scientific classification
- Kingdom: Animalia
- Phylum: Arthropoda
- Clade: Pancrustacea
- Class: Insecta
- Order: Coleoptera
- Suborder: Polyphaga
- Infraorder: Scarabaeiformia
- Family: Scarabaeidae
- Genus: Hybocamenta
- Species: H. atriceps

Binomial name
- Hybocamenta atriceps Moser, 1917

Species of beetle

Hybocamenta atriceps is a species of beetle of the family Scarabaeidae. It is found in Tanzania.

== Description ==
Adults reach a length of about 8 mm. They are reddish-brown, with a black head. The latter is densely covered with punctures and the antennae are reddish-brown. The pronotum is rather densely and finely punctate and the elytra are covered with strong punctures.
