= Hybocamenta benitoana =

Scientific classification
- Kingdom: Animalia
- Phylum: Arthropoda
- Clade: Pancrustacea
- Class: Insecta
- Order: Coleoptera
- Suborder: Polyphaga
- Infraorder: Scarabaeiformia
- Family: Scarabaeidae
- Genus: Hybocamenta
- Species: H. benitoana

Binomial name
- Hybocamenta benitoana Brenske, 1898

Species of beetle

Hybocamenta benitoana is a species of beetle of the family Scarabaeidae. It is found in Gabon, Ghana, the Democratic Republic of the Congo and Equatorial Guinea.

== Description ==
Adults reach a length of about 9.5–10.5 mm (0.37–0.41 in). They are pitch-brown underneath, and completely black or with a reddish-brown pronotum above, sometimes also with brownish elytra, and rarely with the head entirely brown. The clypeus is weakly emarginate anteriorly, dull and finely punctate up to the distinct keel with a weak row of setae at the deepest point, then very densely and wrinkledly punctate up to the strong frons. The pronotum is finely punctate, with the hind angles rounded, the posterior margin strongly impressed on both sides, the middle almost tuberculate. The scutellum is finely punctate. On the elytra, the suture is clearly demarcated, as are several ribs bordered by rows of punctures, the first and last of which unite in an arc at the apex. Between the ribs, the punctation is quite strong. The pointed pygidium is densely and finely, but distinctly, punctate.
