= Hybocamenta nigrita =

Scientific classification
- Kingdom: Animalia
- Phylum: Arthropoda
- Class: Insecta
- Order: Coleoptera
- Suborder: Polyphaga
- Infraorder: Scarabaeiformia
- Family: Scarabaeidae
- Genus: Hybocamenta
- Species: H. nigrita

Binomial name
- Hybocamenta nigrita (Blanchard, 1850)

Synonyms
- Ablabera nigrita Blanchard, 1850; Ablabera rufipennis Fåhraeus, 1857; Ablabera intermedia Blanchard, 1850

Species of beetle

Hybocamenta nigrita is a species of beetle of the family Scarabaeidae. It is found in South Africa (KwaZulu-Natal, Eastern Cape).

== Description ==
Adults reach a length of about 10–11 mm. They are fuscous, testaceous or chestnut-brown, but with the head always more or less deeply infuscate. The club of the antennae is flavous in males and piceous-red in females.
