= Camenta salisburiana =

Scientific classification
- Kingdom: Animalia
- Phylum: Arthropoda
- Class: Insecta
- Order: Coleoptera
- Suborder: Polyphaga
- Infraorder: Scarabaeiformia
- Family: Scarabaeidae
- Genus: Camenta
- Species: C. salisburiana

Binomial name
- Camenta salisburiana Péringuey, 1904

Species of beetle

Camenta salisburiana is a species of beetle of the family Scarabaeidae. It is found in Zimbabwe.

== Description ==
Adults reach a length of about 8–9 mm. They are testaceous, with the head and prothorax deeper brick-red. It very closely resembles Camenta capicola, but the clypeus is not so arcuately emarginate in the anterior part in the male, and the inner joint of the antennal club is as long as the one following. In females, the fourth joint of the pedicel is quite aculeate, and although very small, might almost be considered as part of the club. The punctures on the head, prothorax, and elytra are similar in both species.
