= Hybocamenta simillima =

Scientific classification
- Kingdom: Animalia
- Phylum: Arthropoda
- Class: Insecta
- Order: Coleoptera
- Suborder: Polyphaga
- Infraorder: Scarabaeiformia
- Family: Scarabaeidae
- Genus: Hybocamenta
- Species: H. simillima

Binomial name
- Hybocamenta simillima (Péringuey, 1904)

Synonyms
- Camenta (Hybocamenta) simillima Péringuey, 1904

Species of beetle

Hybocamenta simillima is a species of beetle of the family Scarabaeidae. It is found in South Africa (KwaZulu-Natal).

== Description ==
Adults reach a length of about 6 mm. They are similar to Hybocamenta rufina, but much smaller, but with the same colouration (an infuscate head and scutellum, a reddish prothorax and testaceous elytra). They are paler than H. rufina however. It is a little more parallel, the whole antennae are black instead of flavous, the costules on the elytra are very feebly indicated, and the punctures are proportionately deeper.
