= Camenta innocua =

Scientific classification
- Kingdom: Animalia
- Phylum: Arthropoda
- Class: Insecta
- Order: Coleoptera
- Suborder: Polyphaga
- Infraorder: Scarabaeiformia
- Family: Scarabaeidae
- Genus: Camenta
- Species: C. innocua

Binomial name
- Camenta innocua (Boheman, 1857)

Synonyms
- Ablabera innocua Boheman, 1857

Species of beetle

Camenta innocua is a species of beetle of the family Scarabaeidae. It is found in South Africa (KwaZulu-Natal).

== Description ==
Adults reach a length of about 13–14 mm. They are very similar to Eucamenta castanea, but the clypeus is more rounded laterally in the anterior part. Its margin is slightly sinuate in both sexes. Furthermore, the club of the male is longer than the pedicel, and the inner joint is shorter by one-third than the second. In females the club is a little shorter than the pedicel, but all the joints are of equal length, and the fourth basal joint is plainly acuminate.
