= Camenta westermanni =

Scientific classification
- Kingdom: Animalia
- Phylum: Arthropoda
- Clade: Pancrustacea
- Class: Insecta
- Order: Coleoptera
- Suborder: Polyphaga
- Infraorder: Scarabaeiformia
- Family: Scarabaeidae
- Genus: Camenta
- Species: C. westermanni

Binomial name
- Camenta westermanni Harold, 1878

Species of beetle

Camenta westermanni is a species of beetle of the family Scarabaeidae. It is found in Angola, the Central African Republic and the Democratic Republic of the Congo.

== Description ==
Adults reach a length of about 20 mm (0.79 in). They are bright, reddish-brown, sometimes chestnut, with the thorax densely punctulate, and the elytra densely punctate, subrugulose and striated.
