= Eucamenta castanea =

Scientific classification
- Kingdom: Animalia
- Phylum: Arthropoda
- Class: Insecta
- Order: Coleoptera
- Suborder: Polyphaga
- Infraorder: Scarabaeiformia
- Family: Scarabaeidae
- Genus: Eucamenta
- Species: E. castanea

Binomial name
- Eucamenta castanea (Boheman, 1857)

Synonyms
- Ablabera castanea Boheman, 1857

Species of beetle

Eucamenta castanea is a species of beetle of the family Scarabaeidae. It is found in South Africa (KwaZulu-Natal, Eastern Cape).

== Description ==
Adults reach a length of about 15–17 mm. They are chestnut-brown and shining, with the club of the antennae flavescent. The head and clypeus are covered with nearly contiguous punctures. The prothorax is covered with somewhat small, round punctures divided by a smooth interval equal in width to their own diameter. The elytra are covered with slightly rugose, unequal punctures very closely set, and having in the dorsal part three geminate punctulate striae.
