= Hybocamenta rufina =

Scientific classification
- Kingdom: Animalia
- Phylum: Arthropoda
- Class: Insecta
- Order: Coleoptera
- Suborder: Polyphaga
- Infraorder: Scarabaeiformia
- Family: Scarabaeidae
- Genus: Hybocamenta
- Species: H. rufina

Binomial name
- Hybocamenta rufina (Fåhraeus, 1857)

Synonyms
- Ablabera rufina Fåhraeus, 1857

Species of beetle

Hybocamenta rufina is a species of beetle of the family Scarabaeidae. It is found in South Africa (KwaZulu-Natal).

== Description ==
Adults reach a length of about 8-9.5 mm. The head is fuscous and the prothorax is distinctly red. The scutellum is black, the elytra testaceous and the antennal club is flavous in males and rufescent in females. The head is somewhat coarsely punctured, while the prothorax is deeply punctured. The elytra have the dorsal costules plainly defined, and the punctures are round and separated by smooth intervals.
