= Glenea omeiensis =

Scientific classification
- Domain: Eukaryota
- Kingdom: Animalia
- Phylum: Arthropoda
- Class: Insecta
- Order: Coleoptera
- Suborder: Polyphaga
- Infraorder: Cucujiformia
- Family: Cerambycidae
- Genus: Glenea
- Species: G. omeiensis

Binomial name
- Glenea omeiensis Chiang, 1963

Species of beetle

Glenea omeiensis is a species of beetle in the family Cerambycidae. It was described by Chiang in 1963.
