= Glenea jordani =

Scientific classification
- Kingdom: Animalia
- Phylum: Arthropoda
- Class: Insecta
- Order: Coleoptera
- Suborder: Polyphaga
- Infraorder: Cucujiformia
- Family: Cerambycidae
- Genus: Glenea
- Species: G. jordani

Binomial name
- Glenea jordani Lepesme & Breuning, 1952

Species of beetle

Glenea jordani is a species of beetle in the family Cerambycidae. It was described by Lepesme and Stephan von Breuning in 1952.

== Subspecies ==
- Glenea jordani jordani Lepesme & Breuning, 1952
- Glenea jordani zairensis Breuning, 1981

== Varietas ==
- Glenea jordani var. gabunensis Breuning
- Glenea jordani var. interruptevittata Breuning
- Glenea jordani var. orientalis Aurivillius
- Glenea jordani var. trivitticeps Lepesme & Breuning
- Glenea jordani var. vagemaculata Breuning
