= Glenea clytoides =

Scientific classification
- Domain: Eukaryota
- Kingdom: Animalia
- Phylum: Arthropoda
- Class: Insecta
- Order: Coleoptera
- Suborder: Polyphaga
- Infraorder: Cucujiformia
- Family: Cerambycidae
- Genus: Glenea
- Species: G. clytoides

Binomial name
- Glenea clytoides (Pascoe, 1867)

Synonyms
- Cryllis clytoides Pascoe, 1867

Species of beetle

Glenea clytoides is a species of beetle in the family Cerambycidae. It was described by Francis Polkinghorne Pascoe in 1867. It is known from Singapore and Malaysia.

== Subspecies ==
- Glenea clytoides bankaensis Breuning, 1956
- Glenea clytoides clytoides (Pascoe, 1867)
