= Glenea flavorubra =

Scientific classification
- Kingdom: Animalia
- Phylum: Arthropoda
- Class: Insecta
- Order: Coleoptera
- Suborder: Polyphaga
- Infraorder: Cucujiformia
- Family: Cerambycidae
- Genus: Glenea
- Species: G. flavorubra

Binomial name
- Glenea flavorubra Gressitt, 1940

Species of beetle

Glenea flavorubra is a species of beetle in the family Cerambycidae. It was described by Gressitt in 1940.

The larvae of this beetle, commonly called the mother head borer, bore into wood, where it can cause extensive damage to live or felled trees.
