= Glenea tonkinea =

Scientific classification
- Domain: Eukaryota
- Kingdom: Animalia
- Phylum: Arthropoda
- Class: Insecta
- Order: Coleoptera
- Suborder: Polyphaga
- Infraorder: Cucujiformia
- Family: Cerambycidae
- Genus: Glenea
- Species: G. tonkinea

Binomial name
- Glenea tonkinea Aurivillius, 1925

Species of beetle

Glenea tonkinea is a species of beetle in the family Cerambycidae.
