= Glenea vingerhoedti =

Scientific classification
- Domain: Eukaryota
- Kingdom: Animalia
- Phylum: Arthropoda
- Class: Insecta
- Order: Coleoptera
- Suborder: Polyphaga
- Infraorder: Cucujiformia
- Family: Cerambycidae
- Genus: Glenea
- Species: G. vingerhoedti

Binomial name
- Glenea vingerhoedti Téocchi & Sudre, 2003

Species of beetle

Glenea vingerhoedti is a species of beetle in the family Cerambycidae. It was described by Pierre Téocchi and Jérôme Sudre in 2003.
