= Glenea nitidicollis =

Scientific classification
- Domain: Eukaryota
- Kingdom: Animalia
- Phylum: Arthropoda
- Class: Insecta
- Order: Coleoptera
- Suborder: Polyphaga
- Infraorder: Cucujiformia
- Family: Cerambycidae
- Genus: Glenea
- Species: G. nitidicollis

Binomial name
- Glenea nitidicollis Aurivillius, 1920

Species of beetle

Glenea nitidicollis is a species of beetle in the family Cerambycidae. It was described by Per Olof Christopher Aurivillius in 1920.

== Subspecies ==
- Glenea nitidicollis nitidicollis Aurivillius, 1920
- Glenea nitidicollis rufina Breuning, 1976
