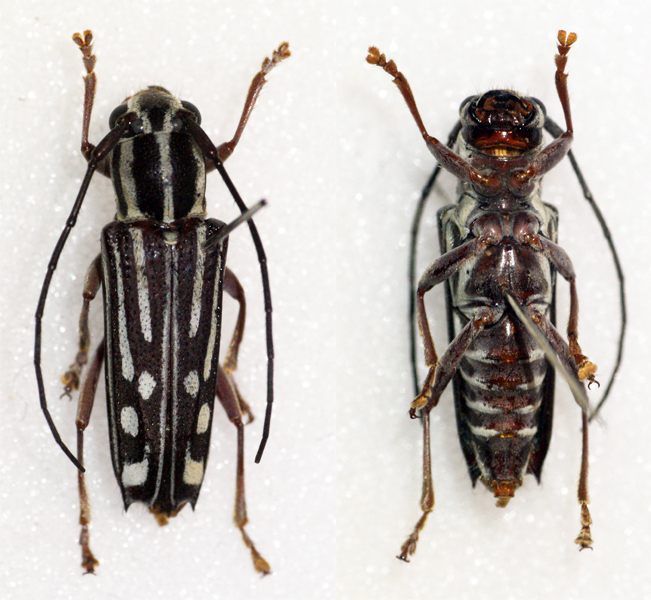

Scientific classification
- Domain: Eukaryota
- Kingdom: Animalia
- Phylum: Arthropoda
- Class: Insecta
- Order: Coleoptera
- Suborder: Polyphaga
- Infraorder: Cucujiformia
- Family: Cerambycidae
- Genus: Glenea
- Species: G. giraffa

Binomial name
- Glenea giraffa Dalman, 1817

Synonyms
- Glenea jucunda Thomson, 1860

= Glenea giraffa =

Species of beetle

Glenea giraffa is a species of beetle in the family Cerambycidae. It was described by Dalman in 1817.
