= Glenea sangirica =

Scientific classification
- Kingdom: Animalia
- Phylum: Arthropoda
- Clade: Pancrustacea
- Class: Insecta
- Order: Coleoptera
- Suborder: Polyphaga
- Infraorder: Cucujiformia
- Family: Cerambycidae
- Genus: Glenea
- Species: G. sangirica

Binomial name
- Glenea sangirica Aurivillius, 1903

Synonyms
- Glenea sanghirica Aurivillius, 1903 Breuning, 1966 (misspelling)

Species of beetle

Glenea sangirica is a species of beetle in the family Cerambycidae. It was described by Per Olof Christopher Aurivillius in 1903 and is known from Sulawesi.
