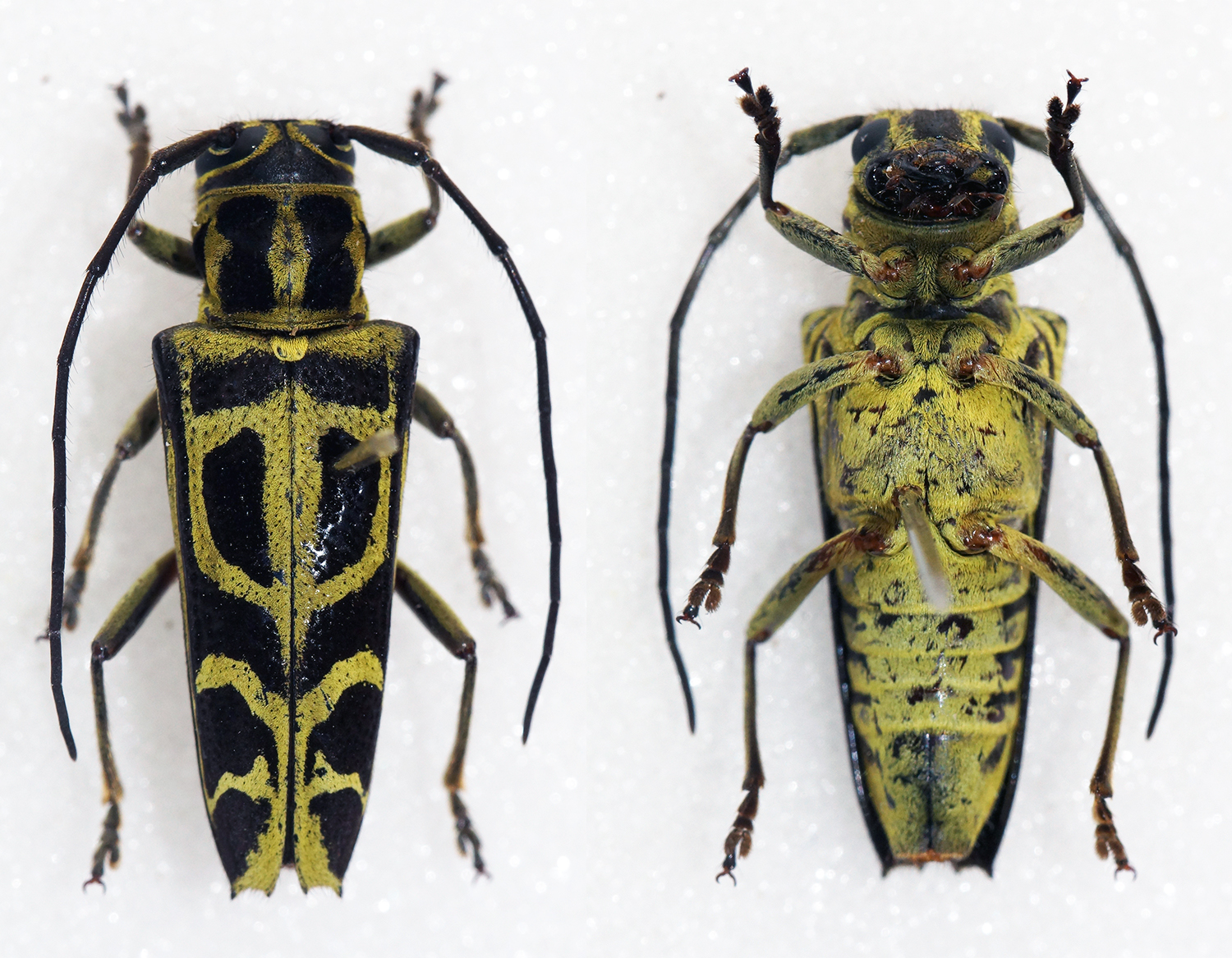

Scientific classification
- Kingdom: Animalia
- Phylum: Arthropoda
- Class: Insecta
- Order: Coleoptera
- Suborder: Polyphaga
- Infraorder: Cucujiformia
- Family: Cerambycidae
- Genus: Glenea
- Species: G. calypso

Binomial name
- Glenea calypso Pascoe, 1867

Synonyms
- Glenea gloriosa Heller, 1916

= Glenea calypso =

Species of beetle

Glenea calypso is a species of beetle in the family Cerambycidae. It was described by Francis Polkinghorne Pascoe in 1867. It is known from Borneo, Sumatra and Malaysia.
