= Glenea coomani =

Scientific classification
- Kingdom: Animalia
- Phylum: Arthropoda
- Class: Insecta
- Order: Coleoptera
- Suborder: Polyphaga
- Infraorder: Cucujiformia
- Family: Cerambycidae
- Genus: Glenea
- Species: G. coomani

Binomial name
- Glenea coomani Pic, 1926

Species of beetle

Glenea coomani is a species of beetle in the family Cerambycidae.
