= Glenea langana =

Scientific classification
- Kingdom: Animalia
- Phylum: Arthropoda
- Class: Insecta
- Order: Coleoptera
- Suborder: Polyphaga
- Infraorder: Cucujiformia
- Family: Cerambycidae
- Genus: Glenea
- Species: G. langana

Binomial name
- Glenea langana Pic, 1903

Synonyms
- Glenea atrolateralis Pic, 1926; Glenea cardinalis langana Pic, 1903; Glenea nigromarginella Wang & Chiang, 2002

Species of beetle

Glenea langana is a species of beetle in the family Cerambycidae. It was described by Maurice Pic in 1903. It is found in Laos, China (Guangxi, Yunnan), Thailand and Vietnam.
