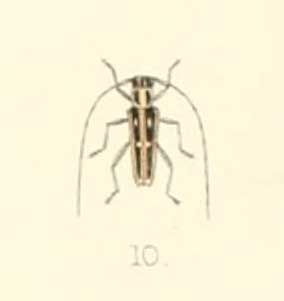

Scientific classification
- Domain: Eukaryota
- Kingdom: Animalia
- Phylum: Arthropoda
- Class: Insecta
- Order: Coleoptera
- Suborder: Polyphaga
- Infraorder: Cucujiformia
- Family: Cerambycidae
- Genus: Glenea
- Species: G. suturalis

Binomial name
- Glenea suturalis Jordan, 1894

= Glenea suturalis =

Species of beetle

Glenea suturalis is a species of beetle in the family Cerambycidae. It was described by Karl Jordan in 1894. It is known from Indonesia.

== Subspecies ==
- Glenea suturalis ruficauda Aurivillius, 1903
- Glenea suturalis suturalis Jordan, 1894
