= Glenea ornata =

Scientific classification
- Domain: Eukaryota
- Kingdom: Animalia
- Phylum: Arthropoda
- Class: Insecta
- Order: Coleoptera
- Suborder: Polyphaga
- Infraorder: Cucujiformia
- Family: Cerambycidae
- Genus: Glenea
- Species: G. ornata

Binomial name
- Glenea ornata Gahan, 1889

Synonyms
- Glenea (Glenea) ornata Breuning, 1956; Glenea (Glenea) ornata f. pseudornata Breuning, 1956

Species of beetle

Glenea ornata is a species of beetle in the family Cerambycidae.
