= Glenea difficilis =

Scientific classification
- Domain: Eukaryota
- Kingdom: Animalia
- Phylum: Arthropoda
- Class: Insecta
- Order: Coleoptera
- Suborder: Polyphaga
- Infraorder: Cucujiformia
- Family: Cerambycidae
- Genus: Glenea
- Species: G. difficilis

Binomial name
- Glenea difficilis Lin & Tavakilian, 2009

Species of beetle

Glenea difficilis is a species of beetle in the family Cerambycidae. It was described by Lin and Tavakilian in 2009.
