= Glenea apicaloides =

Scientific classification
- Kingdom: Animalia
- Phylum: Arthropoda
- Class: Insecta
- Order: Coleoptera
- Suborder: Polyphaga
- Infraorder: Cucujiformia
- Family: Cerambycidae
- Genus: Glenea
- Species: G. apicaloides

Binomial name
- Glenea apicaloides Breuning, 1958

Synonyms
- Glenea apicalis Aurivillius, 1914 nec Chevrolat, 1857

Species of beetle

Glenea apicaloides is a species of beetle in the family Cerambycidae. It was described by Stephan von Breuning in 1958. It is known from Uganda.
