= Glenea subregularis =

Scientific classification
- Kingdom: Animalia
- Phylum: Arthropoda
- Class: Insecta
- Order: Coleoptera
- Suborder: Polyphaga
- Infraorder: Cucujiformia
- Family: Cerambycidae
- Genus: Glenea
- Species: G. subregularis

Binomial name
- Glenea subregularis Pic, 1943

Synonyms
- Glenea fainanensis subregularis (Pic) Breuning, 1956; Glenea fainanensis subregularis m. ochreicolor Breuning, 1956; Glenea internedivisa var. subregularis Pic, 1943; Glenea tenuivittata Gressitt, 1951

Species of beetle

Glenea subregularis is a species of beetle in the family Cerambycidae. It was described by Maurice Pic in 1943.
