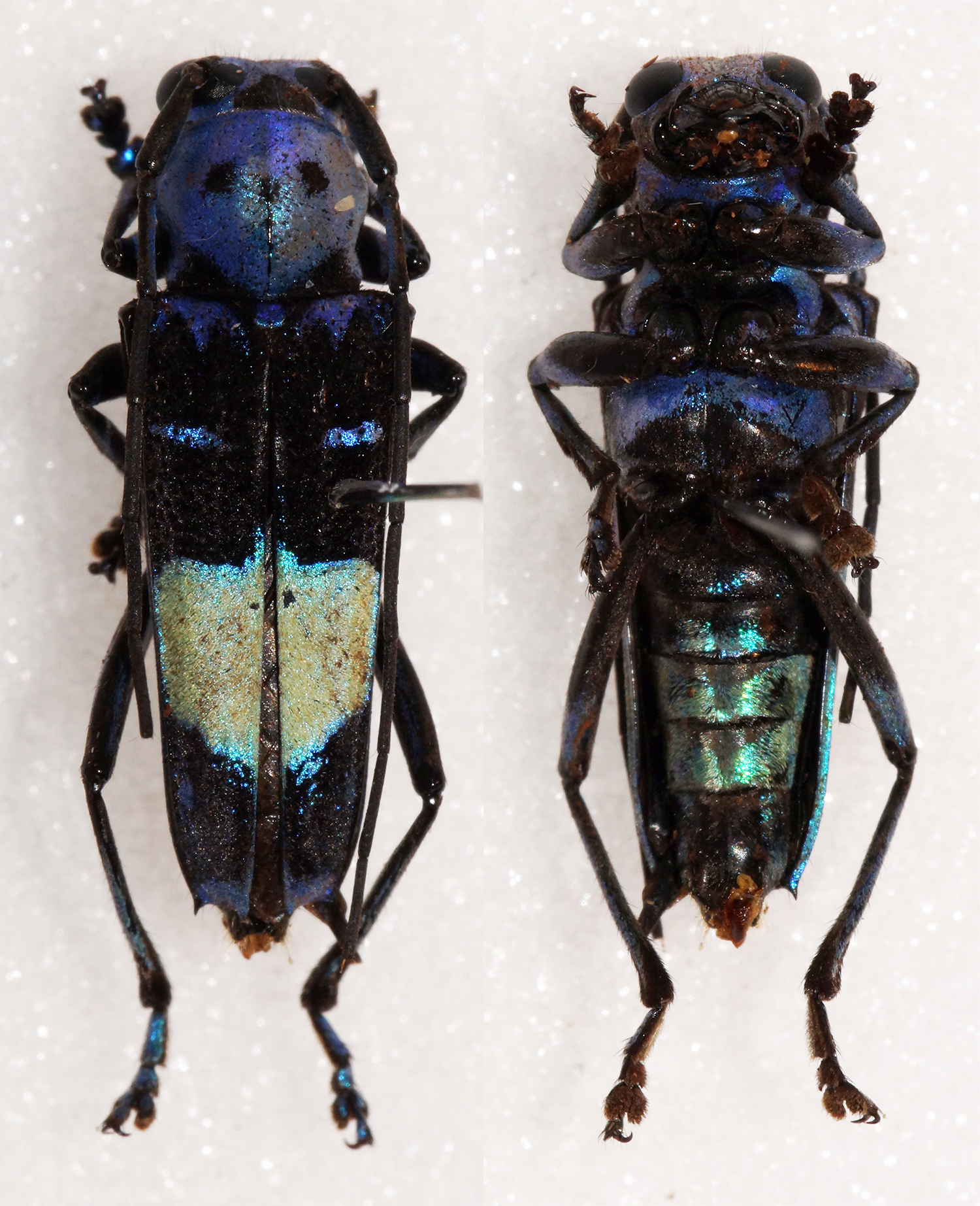

Scientific classification
- Kingdom: Animalia
- Phylum: Arthropoda
- Class: Insecta
- Order: Coleoptera
- Suborder: Polyphaga
- Infraorder: Cucujiformia
- Family: Cerambycidae
- Genus: Glenea
- Species: G. annuliventris

Binomial name
- Glenea annuliventris (Pic, 1926)

Synonyms
- Paraglenea annuliventris Pic, 1926

= Glenea annuliventris =

Species of beetle

Glenea annuliventris is a species of beetle in the family Cerambycidae. It was described by Maurice Pic in 1926. It is known from Vietnam and Thailand.
