= Glenea rubrobasicornis =

Scientific classification
- Kingdom: Animalia
- Phylum: Arthropoda
- Class: Insecta
- Order: Coleoptera
- Suborder: Polyphaga
- Infraorder: Cucujiformia
- Family: Cerambycidae
- Genus: Glenea
- Species: G. rubrobasicornis

Binomial name
- Glenea rubrobasicornis Breuning, 1962

Synonyms
- Glenea rufulibasicornis Breuning, 1963

Species of beetle

Glenea rubrobasicornis is a species of beetle in the family Cerambycidae. It was described by Stephan von Breuning in 1962. It is known from Borneo.
