= Glenea meridionalis =

Scientific classification
- Kingdom: Animalia
- Phylum: Arthropoda
- Class: Insecta
- Order: Coleoptera
- Suborder: Polyphaga
- Infraorder: Cucujiformia
- Family: Cerambycidae
- Genus: Glenea
- Species: G. meridionalis

Binomial name
- Glenea meridionalis Pic, 1943

Species of beetle

Glenea meridionalis is a species of beetle in the family Cerambycidae. It was described by Maurice Pic in 1943.
