= Glenea subviridescens =

Scientific classification
- Kingdom: Animalia
- Phylum: Arthropoda
- Class: Insecta
- Order: Coleoptera
- Suborder: Polyphaga
- Infraorder: Cucujiformia
- Family: Cerambycidae
- Genus: Glenea
- Species: G. subviridescens

Binomial name
- Glenea subviridescens Breuning, 1963

Species of beetle

Glenea subviridescens is a species of beetle in the family Cerambycidae. It was described by Stephan von Breuning in 1963. It is known from Laos, Thailand, Vietnam and China.
