= Glenea centroguttata =

Scientific classification
- Kingdom: Animalia
- Phylum: Arthropoda
- Class: Insecta
- Order: Coleoptera
- Suborder: Polyphaga
- Infraorder: Cucujiformia
- Family: Cerambycidae
- Genus: Glenea
- Species: G. centroguttata

Binomial name
- Glenea centroguttata Fairmaire, 1897

Synonyms
- Glenea issikii Mitono, 1934

Species of beetle

Glenea centroguttata is a species of beetle in the family Cerambycidae. It was described by Léon Fairmaire in 1897. It is known from Taiwan, China and Japan.
