= Glenea viridescens =

Scientific classification
- Kingdom: Animalia
- Phylum: Arthropoda
- Class: Insecta
- Order: Coleoptera
- Suborder: Polyphaga
- Infraorder: Cucujiformia
- Family: Cerambycidae
- Genus: Glenea
- Species: G. viridescens

Binomial name
- Glenea viridescens Pic, 1927

Species of beetle

Glenea viridescens is a species of beetle in the family Cerambycidae. It was described by Maurice Pic in 1927. It is known from Vietnam.

== Varietas ==
- Glenea viridescens var. bialbopunctata Breuning, 1956
- Glenea viridescens var. coeruleosuturalis Breuning, 1956
