= Glenea flava =

Scientific classification
- Domain: Eukaryota
- Kingdom: Animalia
- Phylum: Arthropoda
- Class: Insecta
- Order: Coleoptera
- Suborder: Polyphaga
- Infraorder: Cucujiformia
- Family: Cerambycidae
- Genus: Glenea
- Species: G. flava

Binomial name
- Glenea flava Jordan, 1895

Synonyms
- Glenea atroapicalis Pic, 1926

Species of beetle

Glenea flava is a species of beetle in the family Cerambycidae. It was described by Karl Jordan in 1895.
