= Glenea myrsine =

Scientific classification
- Kingdom: Animalia
- Phylum: Arthropoda
- Class: Insecta
- Order: Coleoptera
- Suborder: Polyphaga
- Infraorder: Cucujiformia
- Family: Cerambycidae
- Genus: Glenea
- Species: G. myrsine

Binomial name
- Glenea myrsine Pascoe, 1867

Synonyms
- Glenea areca Pascoe, 1867; Glenea cryllis J. Thomson, 1879; Glenea malaccensis Breuning, 1956

Species of beetle

Glenea myrsine is a species of beetle in the family Cerambycidae. It was described by Francis Polkinghorne Pascoe in 1867. It is known from Malaysia and Borneo.
