= Glenea novemguttata =

Scientific classification
- Kingdom: Animalia
- Phylum: Arthropoda
- Clade: Pancrustacea
- Class: Insecta
- Order: Coleoptera
- Suborder: Polyphaga
- Infraorder: Cucujiformia
- Family: Cerambycidae
- Genus: Glenea
- Species: G. novemguttata

Binomial name
- Glenea novemguttata (Guérin-Méneville, 1831)

Synonyms
- Sphenura novemguttata Guérin-Méneville, 1831

Species of beetle

Glenea novemguttata is a species of beetle in the family Cerambycidae. It was described by Félix Édouard Guérin-Méneville in 1831, originally under the genus Sphenura. It is known from Malaysia, Java and Sumatra.
