= Glenea rufipes =

Scientific classification
- Domain: Eukaryota
- Kingdom: Animalia
- Phylum: Arthropoda
- Class: Insecta
- Order: Coleoptera
- Suborder: Polyphaga
- Infraorder: Cucujiformia
- Family: Cerambycidae
- Genus: Glenea
- Species: G. rufipes

Binomial name
- Glenea rufipes Gressitt, 1939

Synonyms
- Glenea atropubens Pic, 1943; Glenea subsimilis var. atropubens (Pic) Breuning, 1956

Species of beetle

Glenea rufipes is a species of beetle in the family Cerambycidae. It was described by Gressitt in 1939. It is known from Laos, Vietnam and China.
