= Glenea elegantissima =

Scientific classification
- Kingdom: Animalia
- Phylum: Arthropoda
- Class: Insecta
- Order: Coleoptera
- Suborder: Polyphaga
- Infraorder: Cucujiformia
- Family: Cerambycidae
- Genus: Glenea
- Species: G. elegantissima

Binomial name
- Glenea elegantissima Breuning, 1956

Species of beetle

Glenea elegantissima is a species of beetle in the family Cerambycidae. It was described by Stephan von Breuning in 1956.
