= Glenea pseudolaudata =

Scientific classification
- Kingdom: Animalia
- Phylum: Arthropoda
- Class: Insecta
- Order: Coleoptera
- Suborder: Polyphaga
- Infraorder: Cucujiformia
- Family: Cerambycidae
- Genus: Glenea
- Species: G. pseudolaudata

Binomial name
- Glenea pseudolaudata Breuning, 1956

Synonyms
- Glenea flavovittoides Breuning, 1956

Species of beetle

Glenea pseudolaudata is a species of beetle in the family Cerambycidae. It was described by Stephan von Breuning in 1956. It is known from Borneo.
