= Glenea apicespinosa =

Scientific classification
- Kingdom: Animalia
- Phylum: Arthropoda
- Class: Insecta
- Order: Coleoptera
- Suborder: Polyphaga
- Infraorder: Cucujiformia
- Family: Cerambycidae
- Genus: Glenea
- Species: G. apicespinosa

Binomial name
- Glenea apicespinosa Breuning, 1956

Synonyms
- Glenea apicespinosa Hua, 2002; Glenna atricornis apicespinosa Hua, 1987; Glenea atricornis apicespinosa Rondon & Breuning, 1971; Glenea (glenea) atricornis apicespinosa Breuning, 1956; Glenea (glenea) atricornis apicespinosa Breuning, 1966

Species of beetle

Glenea apicespinosa is a species of beetle in the family Cerambycidae. It was described by Stephan von Breuning in 1956. It is known from Laos and China.
