= Glenea alboplagiata =

Scientific classification
- Kingdom: Animalia
- Phylum: Arthropoda
- Class: Insecta
- Order: Coleoptera
- Suborder: Polyphaga
- Infraorder: Cucujiformia
- Family: Cerambycidae
- Genus: Glenea
- Species: G. alboplagiata

Binomial name
- Glenea alboplagiata Breuning, 1958

Species of beetle

Glenea alboplagiata is a species of beetle in the family Cerambycidae. It was described by Stephan von Breuning in 1958. It is known from Borneo.
