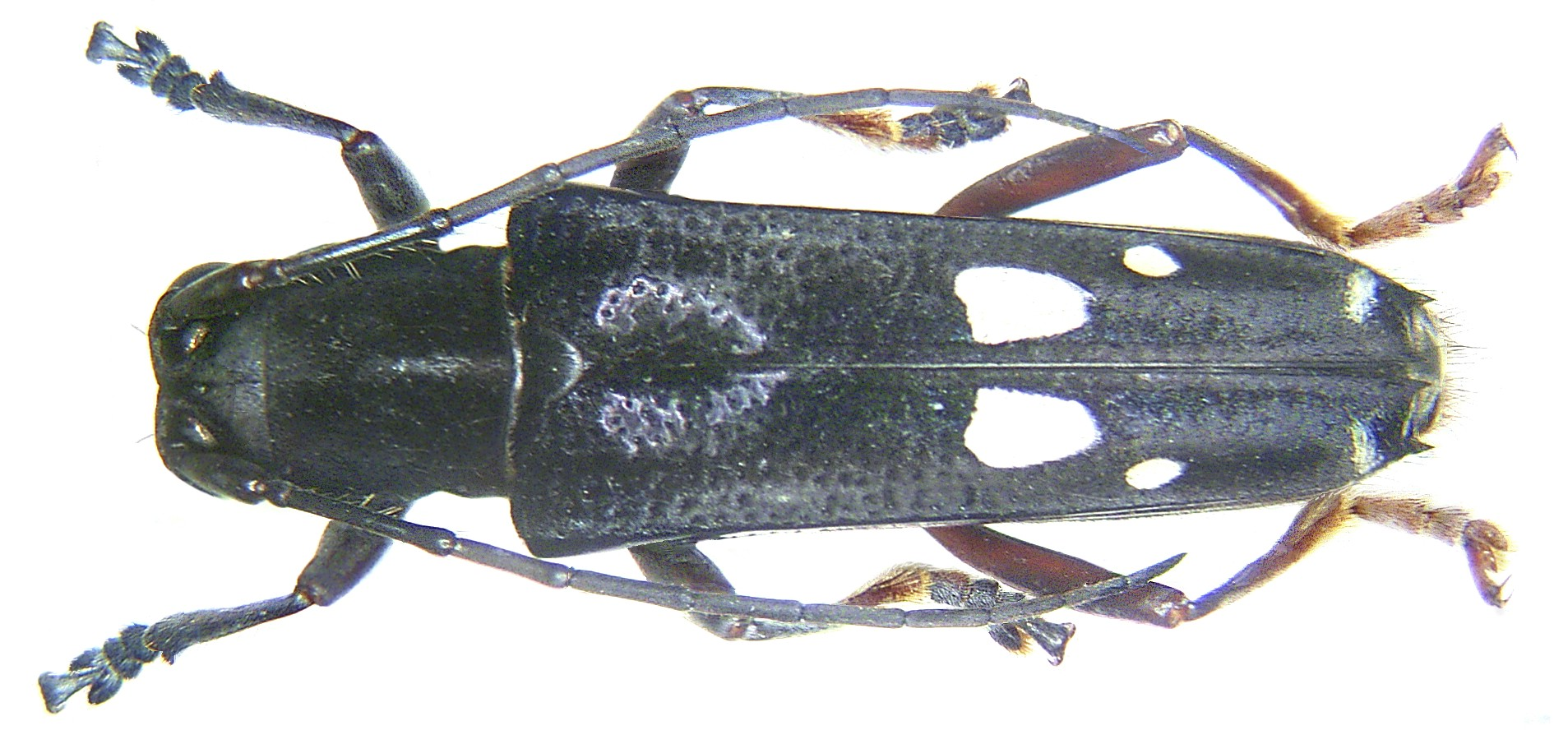

Scientific classification
- Kingdom: Animalia
- Phylum: Arthropoda
- Class: Insecta
- Order: Coleoptera
- Suborder: Polyphaga
- Infraorder: Cucujiformia
- Family: Cerambycidae
- Genus: Glenea
- Species: G. atriceps

Binomial name
- Glenea atriceps Aurivillius, 1911

= Glenea atriceps =

Species of beetle

Glenea atriceps is a species of beetle in the family Cerambycidae. It was described by Per Olof Christopher Aurivillius in 1911 and is known from Borneo and Malaysia. It contains the variety Glenea atriceps var. anticeimpunctata.
