= Glenea melissa =

Scientific classification
- Domain: Eukaryota
- Kingdom: Animalia
- Phylum: Arthropoda
- Class: Insecta
- Order: Coleoptera
- Suborder: Polyphaga
- Infraorder: Cucujiformia
- Family: Cerambycidae
- Genus: Glenea
- Species: G. melissa

Binomial name
- Glenea melissa Pascoe, 1867

Species of beetle

Glenea melissa is a species of beetle in the family Cerambycidae. It was described by Francis Polkinghorne Pascoe in 1867. It is known from Indonesia.

== Subspecies ==
- Glenea melissa melissa Pascoe, 1867
- Glenea melissa vanessa Pascoe, 1867
