= Glenea mira =

Scientific classification
- Domain: Eukaryota
- Kingdom: Animalia
- Phylum: Arthropoda
- Class: Insecta
- Order: Coleoptera
- Suborder: Polyphaga
- Infraorder: Cucujiformia
- Family: Cerambycidae
- Genus: Glenea
- Species: G. mira

Binomial name
- Glenea mira Jordan, 1903

Species of beetle

Glenea mira is a species of beetle in the family Cerambycidae. It was described by Karl Jordan in 1903.

== Subspecies ==
- Glenea mira allardi Breuning, 1972
- Glenea mira bernardii Breuning, 1977
- Glenea mira mira Jordan, 1903
