= Glenea grossepunctata =

Scientific classification
- Kingdom: Animalia
- Phylum: Arthropoda
- Class: Insecta
- Order: Coleoptera
- Suborder: Polyphaga
- Infraorder: Cucujiformia
- Family: Cerambycidae
- Genus: Glenea
- Species: G. grossepunctata

Binomial name
- Glenea grossepunctata Breuning, 1958

Species of beetle

Glenea grossepunctata is a species of beetle in the family Cerambycidae. It was described by Stephan von Breuning in 1958. It is known from Moluccas.

== Subspecies ==
- Glenea grossepunctata grossepunctata Breuning, 1958
- Glenea grossepunctata soembanensis Breuning, 1958
