= Glenea lecta =

Scientific classification
- Domain: Eukaryota
- Kingdom: Animalia
- Phylum: Arthropoda
- Class: Insecta
- Order: Coleoptera
- Suborder: Polyphaga
- Infraorder: Cucujiformia
- Family: Cerambycidae
- Genus: Glenea
- Species: G. lecta

Binomial name
- Glenea lecta Gahan, 1889

Species of beetle

Glenea lecta is a species of beetle in the family Cerambycidae.
