= Glenea plagifera =

Scientific classification
- Kingdom: Animalia
- Phylum: Arthropoda
- Class: Insecta
- Order: Coleoptera
- Suborder: Polyphaga
- Infraorder: Cucujiformia
- Family: Cerambycidae
- Genus: Glenea
- Species: G. plagifera

Binomial name
- Glenea plagifera Aurivillius, 1913

Species of beetle

Glenea plagifera is a species of beetle in the family Cerambycidae. It was described by Per Olof Christopher Aurivillius in 1913. It is known from Borneo and Malaysia. It contains the variety Glenea plagifera var. unimaculata.
