= Glenea fatalis =

Scientific classification
- Kingdom: Animalia
- Phylum: Arthropoda
- Clade: Pancrustacea
- Class: Insecta
- Order: Coleoptera
- Suborder: Polyphaga
- Infraorder: Cucujiformia
- Family: Cerambycidae
- Genus: Glenea
- Species: G. fatalis

Binomial name
- Glenea fatalis Pascoe, 1867

Synonyms
- Glenea biapicalis J. Thomson, 1879; Glenea fuscofemorata Breuning, 1958; Glenea infrapartealba Breuning, 1958

Species of beetle

Glenea fatalis is a species of beetle in the family Cerambycidae. It was described by Francis Polkinghorne Pascoe in 1867. It is known from Malaysia, Borneo and Sumatra.
