= Glenea nigeriae =

Scientific classification
- Domain: Eukaryota
- Kingdom: Animalia
- Phylum: Arthropoda
- Class: Insecta
- Order: Coleoptera
- Suborder: Polyphaga
- Infraorder: Cucujiformia
- Family: Cerambycidae
- Genus: Glenea
- Species: G. nigeriae

Binomial name
- Glenea nigeriae Aurivillius, 1920

Synonyms
- Glenea mirei Breuning, 1977

Species of beetle

Glenea nigeriae is a species of beetle in the family Cerambycidae. It was described by Per Olof Christopher Aurivillius in 1920. It is known from Nigeria, Cameroon, and Equatorial Guinea.
