= Glenea bicolor =

Scientific classification
- Domain: Eukaryota
- Kingdom: Animalia
- Phylum: Arthropoda
- Class: Insecta
- Order: Coleoptera
- Suborder: Polyphaga
- Infraorder: Cucujiformia
- Family: Cerambycidae
- Genus: Glenea
- Species: G. bicolor

Binomial name
- Glenea bicolor Schwarzer, 1924

Species of beetle

Glenea bicolor is a species of beetle in the family Cerambycidae. It was described by Bernhard Schwarzer in 1924.
