= Glenea iriei =

Scientific classification
- Kingdom: Animalia
- Phylum: Arthropoda
- Class: Insecta
- Order: Coleoptera
- Suborder: Polyphaga
- Infraorder: Cucujiformia
- Family: Cerambycidae
- Genus: Glenea
- Species: G. iriei

Binomial name
- Glenea iriei Hayashi, 1971

Species of beetle

Glenea iriei is a species of beetle in the family Cerambycidae. It was described by Masao Hayashi in 1971. It is known from Japan.

== Subspecies ==
- Glenea iriei heikichii Makihara, 1982
- Glenea iriei iriei Hayashi, 1971
