= Glenea mimoscalaris =

Scientific classification
- Kingdom: Animalia
- Phylum: Arthropoda
- Class: Insecta
- Order: Coleoptera
- Suborder: Polyphaga
- Infraorder: Cucujiformia
- Family: Cerambycidae
- Genus: Glenea
- Species: G. mimoscalaris

Binomial name
- Glenea mimoscalaris Breuning, 1969

Species of beetle

Glenea mimoscalaris is a species of beetle in the family Cerambycidae. It was described by Stephan von Breuning in 1969. It is known from Borneo.
