= Glenea pseudocaninia =

Scientific classification
- Kingdom: Animalia
- Phylum: Arthropoda
- Clade: Pancrustacea
- Class: Insecta
- Order: Coleoptera
- Suborder: Polyphaga
- Infraorder: Cucujiformia
- Family: Cerambycidae
- Genus: Glenea
- Species: G. pseudocaninia

Binomial name
- Glenea pseudocaninia Lin & Montreuil, 2009

Species of beetle

Glenea pseudocaninia is a species of beetle in the family Cerambycidae. It was described by Lin and Montreuil in 2009.
