= Glenea nigrifrons =

Scientific classification
- Kingdom: Animalia
- Phylum: Arthropoda
- Class: Insecta
- Order: Coleoptera
- Suborder: Polyphaga
- Infraorder: Cucujiformia
- Family: Cerambycidae
- Genus: Glenea
- Species: G. nigrifrons

Binomial name
- Glenea nigrifrons Aurivillius, 1920

Species of beetle

Glenea nigrifrons is a species of beetle in the family Cerambycidae. It was described by Per Olof Christopher Aurivillius in 1920 and is known from Borneo.
