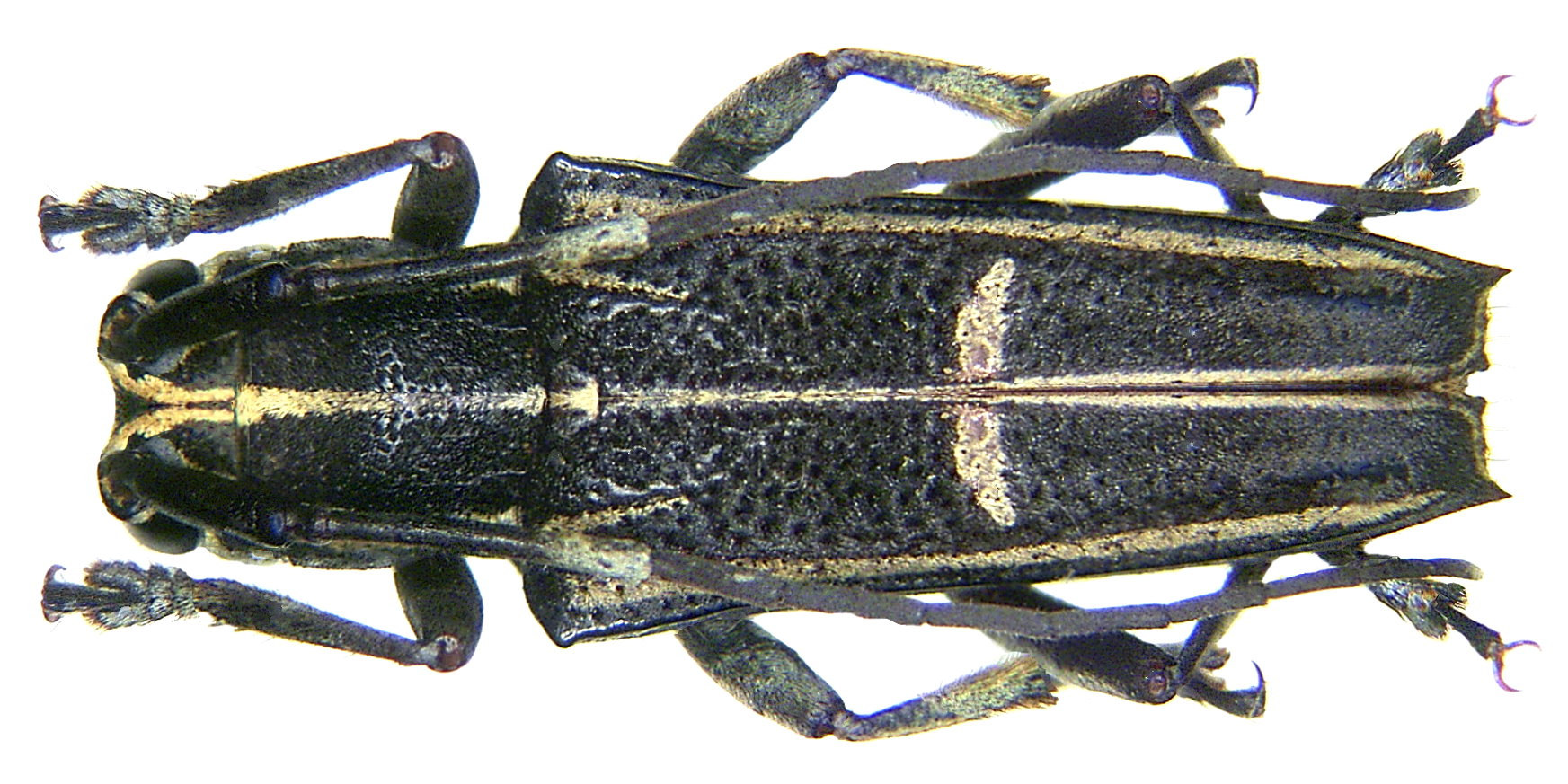

Scientific classification
- Domain: Eukaryota
- Kingdom: Animalia
- Phylum: Arthropoda
- Class: Insecta
- Order: Coleoptera
- Suborder: Polyphaga
- Infraorder: Cucujiformia
- Family: Cerambycidae
- Genus: Glenea
- Species: G. versuta

Binomial name
- Glenea versuta Newman, 1832

= Glenea versuta =

Species of beetle

Glenea versuta is a species of beetle in the family Cerambycidae. It was described by Newman in 1832. It is known from the Philippines.

== Subspecies ==
- Glenea versuta palawanicola Breuning, 1956
- Glenea versuta versuta Newman, 1832
