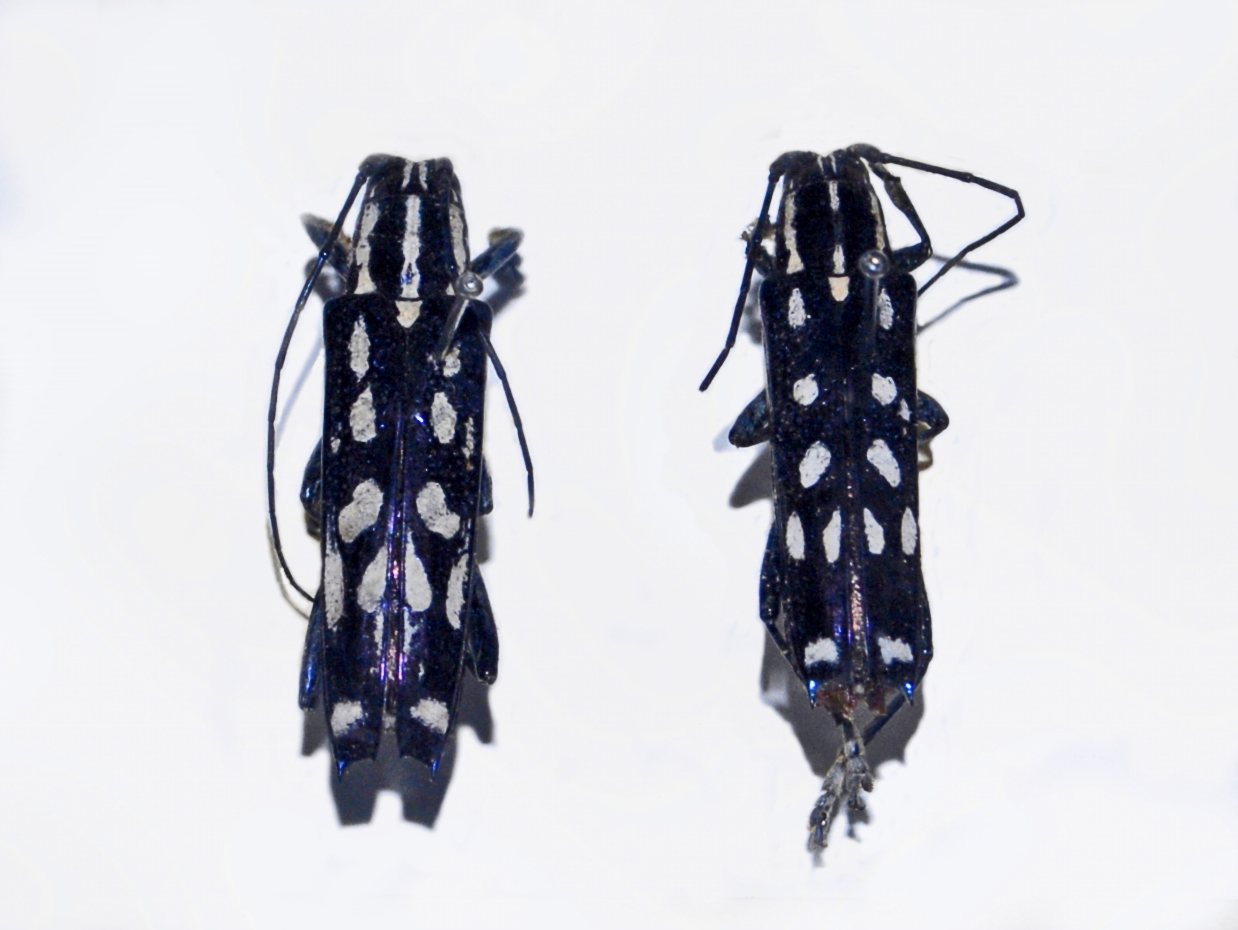
- Glenea venus

Scientific classification
- Kingdom: Animalia
- Phylum: Arthropoda
- Clade: Pancrustacea
- Class: Insecta
- Order: Coleoptera
- Suborder: Polyphaga
- Infraorder: Cucujiformia
- Family: Cerambycidae
- Subfamily: Lamiinae
- Tribe: Saperdini
- Genus: Glenea; Newman, 1842

Synonyms
- Sphenura Dejean 1837 (Homonym); Sphenura Laporte 1840 (Homonym); Hapochoron Gistel 1848; Stibara Thomson 1857 (Homonym); Cryllis Pascoe 1867; Moraegamus Lacordaire 1872 (Homonym); Accola Jordan 1894 (Homonym)

= Glenea =

Genus of beetles

Glenea is a genus of longhorn beetles belonging to the family Cerambycidae, subfamily Lamiinae.

== Species ==
An incomplete list of species includes:

subgenus Accolona

- Glenea astathiformis Breuning, 1958
- Glenea superba Breuning, 1958

subgenus Acronioglenea

- Glenea besucheti Breuning, 1974

subgenus Acutoglenea

- Glenea acuta (Fabricius, 1801)
- Glenea albovittata Breuning, 1956
- Glenea cardinalis Thomson, 1860
- Glenea dimorpha Vives, 2005
- Glenea erythrodera Gahan, 1907
- Glenea extensa Pascoe, 1858
- Glenea langana Pic, 1903
- Glenea numerifera J. Thomson, 1865
- Glenea subochracea Breuning, 1958
- Glenea theodosia J. Thomson, 1879
- Glenea versuta Newman, 1832

subgenus Annuliglenea

- Glenea annuliventris (Pic, 1926)

subgenus Aridoglenea

- Glenea arida Thomson, 1865
- Glenea biannulata Breuning, 1961
- Glenea cancellata Thomson, 1865
- Glenea decolorata Heller, 1926
- Glenea delkeskampi Breuning, 1961
- Glenea diversesignata Pic, 1943
- Glenea flavorubra Gressitt, 1940
- Glenea lineatithorax Pic, 1926
- Glenea meridionalis Pic, 1943
- Glenea obsoleta Aurivillius, 1914
- Glenea pseudovaga Breuning, 1961
- Glenea scopifera Pascoe, 1859
- Glenea shuteae M.Y. Lin & X.K. Yang, 2011
- Glenea subarida Breuning, 1958
- Glenea vaga Thomson, 1865
- Glenea vagemaculipennis Breuning, 1961

subgenus Bajoglenea

- Glenea baja Jordan, 1903
- Glenea pseudobaja Breuning, 1952

subgenus Brunneoglenea

- Glenea brunnipennis Breuning, 1958
- Glenea salwattyana Breuning, 1966

subgenus Citrinoglenea

- Glenea anterufipennis Breuning, 1968
- Glenea citrina J. Thomson, 1865
- Glenea gardneriana Breuning, 1958

subgenus Cylindroglenea

- Glenea cylindrica Aurivillius

subgenus Elongatoglenea

- Glenea carinipennis Breuning, 1961
- Glenea elongatipennis Breuning, 1952
- Glenea nigroscutellaris Breuning, 1973
- Glenea rufipennis Breuning, 1952

subgenus Euglenea

- Glenea sarasinorum Heller, 1896

subgenus Fasciculoglenea

- Glenea fasciculosa Breuning

subgenus Formosoglenea

- Glenea ochreomaculata Breuning, 1969

subgenus Grossoglenea

- Glenea grandis Schwarzer, 1929

subgenus Jordanoglenea

- Glenea jordani Lepesme & Breuning, 1952

subgenus Lineatoglenea

- Glenea lineatopunctata Breuning, 1950

subgenus Luteoglenea

- Glenea maculicollis Breuning, 1950

subgenus Macroglenea

- Glenea beatrix Thomson, 1879
- Glenea bisbiguttata Ritsema, 1892
- Glenea corona Thomson, 1879
- Glenea elegans (Olivier, 1795)
- Glenea florensis Ritsema, 1892
- Glenea hasselti Ritsema, 1892
- Glenea juno J. Thomson, 1865
- Glenea nivea Ritsema, 1892
- Glenea nympha J. Thomson, 1865
- Glenea similis Ritsema, 1892
- Glenea venus Thomson, 1865

subgenus Menesioglenea

- Glenea menesioides Breuning, 1969

subgenus Mesoglenea

- Glenea invitticollis Breuning, 1956

subgenus Metaglenea

- Glenea pseudograndis Breuning, 1956

subgenus Moraegamus

- Glenea flavicapilla (Chevrolat, 1858)

subgenus Parazosne

- Glenea leucospilota (Westwood, 1841)
- Glenea sangirica Aurivillius, 1903
- Glenea estanleyi (Vives, 2009)

subgenus Poeciloglenea

- Glenea celestis Thomson, 1865
- Glenea celia Pascoe, 1888

subgenus Porphyrioglenea

- Glenea porphyrio Pascoe, 1866

subgenus Pseudotanylecta

- Glenea aterrima Breuning, 1956
- Glenea itzingeri Breuning, 1956
- Glenea keili Ritsema, 1897
- Glenea ochreoplagiata Breuning, 1956
- Glenea speciosa Gahan, 1889
- Glenea tibialis Gahan, 1907

subgenus Punctoglenea

- Glenea francisi Hüdepohl, 1990
- Glenea sexpunctata Aurivillius, 1926

subgenus Reginoglenea

- Glenea perakensis Breuning, 1956
- Glenea regina J. Thomson, 1865

subgenus Rubroglenea

- Glenea nigrorubricollis Lin & Yang, 2009
- Glenea rubricollis (Hope, 1842)
- Glenea subrubricollis Lin & Tavakilian, 2009

subgenus Rufoglenea

- Glenea bankoi Garreau, 2011
- Glenea rufopunctata Gahan, 1907

subgenus Sassoglenea

- Glenea sassensis Breuning

subgenus Spiniglenea

- Glenea spinosipennis Breuning, 1958

subgenus Stiroglenea

- Glenea andamanica Breuning, 1958
- Glenea andrewesi Gahan, 1893
- Glenea angerona J. Thomson, 1865
- Glenea cantor (Fabricius, 1787)
- Glenea grossepunctata Breuning, 1958
- Glenea homonospila Thomson, 1865
- Glenea krausemani Breuning, 1958
- Glenea pseudocantor Breuning, 1958
- Glenea quadrinotata Guérin-Ménéville, 1843
- Glenea spilota Thomson, 1860

subgenus Subgrossoglenea

- Glenea ochreosignata Hüdepohl, 1995
- Glenea subgrandis Breuning, 1956
- Glenea wongi Hüdepohl, 1987

subgenus Tanylecta

- Glenea aegoprepiformis Breuning, 1950
- Glenea lambii (Pascoe, 1866)
- Glenea paralambi Breuning, 1972

subgenus Vanikoroglenea

- Glenea vanikorensis Breuning, 1956

subgenus Vittiglenea

- Glenea kraatzi Thomson, 1865
- Glenea lateflavovittata Breuning, 1980

subgenus Volumnia

- Glenea apicalis (Chevrolat, 1857)
- Glenea jeanneli Breuning, 1958
- Glenea longula Breuning, 1964
- Glenea morosa (Pascoe, 1888)
- Glenea submorosa Breuning, 1952

subgenus Glenea

- Glenea acutipennis Breuning, 1950
- Glenea acutoides Schwarzer, 1925
- Glenea adelpha Thomson, 1858
- Glenea aeolis Thomson, 1879
- Glenea afghana Breuning, 1971
- Glenea albocingulata Aurivillius, 1925
- Glenea albofasciata Gahan, 1897
- Glenea albofasciolata Breuning, 1956
- Glenea albolineata Thomson, 1860
- Glenea albolineosa Breuning, 1956
- Glenea alboplagiata Breuning, 1958
- Glenea alboscutellaris Breuning, 1958
- Glenea albosignatipennis Breuning, 1950
- Glenea albotarsalis Breuning, 1956
- Glenea algebraica (J. Thomson, 1857)
- Glenea aluensis Gahan, 1897
- Glenea amoena Thomson, 1865
- Glenea anticepunctata (J. Thomson, 1857)
- Glenea aphrodite Thomson, 1865
- Glenea apicaloides Breuning, 1958
- Glenea apicepurpurata Hüdepohl, 1990
- Glenea arithmetica (Thomson, 1857)
- Glenea arouensis Thomson, 1858
- Glenea artemis Aurivillius, 1924
- Glenea aspasia Pascoe, 1867
- Glenea assamana Breuning, 1967
- Glenea assamensis Breuning, 1950
- Glenea astarte Thomson, 1865
- Glenea atriceps Aurivillius, 1911
- Glenea atricilla Pesarini & Sabbadini, 1997
- Glenea atricornis Pic, 1943
- Glenea aurivillii Fisher, 1935
- Glenea bakeriana Breuning, 1958
- Glenea balingiti Hüdepohl, 1996
- Glenea balteata (Klug, 1835)
- Glenea bangueyensis Aurivillius, 1920
- Glenea baramensis Breuning, 1950
- Glenea basalis Thomson, 1865
- Glenea basiflavofemorata Breuning, 1956
- Glenea basilana Pic, 1943
- Glenea bellona Thomson, 1879
- Glenea benguetana Aurivillius, 1926
- Glenea bicolor Schwarzer, 1924
- Glenea bidiscovittata Breuning, 1969
- Glenea bimaculicollis Thomson, 1860
- Glenea bimaculipennis Breuning, 1961
- Glenea bisbivittata Aurivillius, 1903
- Glenea bivittata Aurivillius, 1903
- Glenea blandina Pascoe, 1858
- Glenea boafoi Breuning, 1978
- Glenea borneensis Fisher, 1935
- Glenea bryanti Breuning, 1958
- Glenea buquetii Thomson, 1865
- Glenea calypso Pascoe, 1867
- Glenea camelina Pascoe, 1867
- Glenea camilla Pascoe, 1867
- Glenea canidia Thomson, 1865
- Glenea caninia Heller, 1926
- Glenea capriciosa (Thomson, 1857)
- Glenea caraga Heller, 1921
- Glenea carneipes Chevrolat, 1855
- Glenea centralis Breuning, 1956
- Glenea centroguttata Fairmaire, 1897
- Glenea chalybeata Thomson, 1860
- Glenea changchini Lin & Lin, 2011
- Glenea chlorospila Gahan, 1897
- Glenea chrysomaculata Schwarzer, 1925
- Glenea chujoi Mitono, 1937
- Glenea cinerea Thomson, 1865
- Glenea cinna Pascoe, 1867
- Glenea clavifera Aurivillius, 1925
- Glenea cleome Pascoe, 1867
- Glenea clytoides (Pascoe, 1867)
- Glenea colenda Thomson, 1879
- Glenea collaris Pascoe, 1858
- Glenea colobotheoides Thomson, 1865
- Glenea concinna Newman, 1842
- Glenea consanguis Aurivillius, 1925
- Glenea coris Pascoe, 1867
- Glenea crucicollis Breuning, 1956
- Glenea crucipennis Breuning, 1950
- Glenea curvilinea Aurivillius, 1926
- Glenea cyanipennis Thomson, 1858
- Glenea cylindrepomoides Thomson, 1865
- Glenea decemguttata Aurivillius, 1920
- Glenea dejeani Gahan, 1889
- Glenea despecta Pascoe, 1858
- Glenea diana Thomson, 1865
- Glenea dido Aurivillius, 1926
- Glenea didyma Aurivillius, 1903
- Glenea difficilis Lin & Tavakilian, 2009
- Glenea dimidiata (Fabricius, 1801)
- Glenea disa Aurivillius, 1911
- Glenea discofasciata Breuning, 1983
- Glenea discoidalis Pascoe, 1867
- Glenea discomaculata Breuning, 1956
- Glenea diverselineata Pic, 1926
- Glenea doriai Breuning, 1950
- Glenea dorsalis Schwarzer, 1930
- Glenea dorsaloides Breuning, 1956
- Glenea elegantissima Breuning, 1956
- Glenea enganensis Breuning, 1982
- Glenea exculta Newman, 1842
- Glenea extrema Sharp, 1900
- Glenea fasciata (Fabricius, 1781)
- Glenea fatalis Pascoe, 1867
- Glenea fissicauda Aurivillius, 1926
- Glenea flava Jordan, 1895
- Glenea flavicollis Aurivillius, 1926
- Glenea flavotincta Aurivillius, 1926
- Glenea flavovittata Aurivillius, 1920
- Glenea fortii Pesarini & Sabbadini, 1997
- Glenea fulvomaculata Thomson, 1860
- Glenea funerula (J. Thomson, 1857)
- Glenea gabonica (Thomson, 1858)
- Glenea gahani Jordan, 1894
- Glenea galathea Thomson, 1865
- Glenea giannii Hüdepohl, 1996
- Glenea giraffa Dalman, 1817
- Glenea glabronotata Pesarini & Sabbadini, 1997
- Glenea glauca Newman, 1842
- Glenea glaucescens Aurivillius, 1903
- Glenea glechomoides Breuning, 1982
- Glenea grisea Thomson, 1860
- Glenea griseolineata Breuning, 1956
- Glenea helleri Aurivillius, 1923
- Glenea heptagona Thomson, 1860
- Glenea hieroglyphica Pesarini & Sabbadini, 1997
- Glenea humeralis Aurivillius, 1926
- Glenea humeroinvittata Breuning, 1956
- Glenea iligana Aurivillius, 1926
- Glenea illuminata (Thomson, 1857)
- Glenea indiana (Thomson, 1857)
- Glenea infraflava Breuning, 1969
- Glenea infragrisea Breuning, 1958
- Glenea insignis Aurivillius, 1903
- Glenea intermixta Aurivillius, 1926
- Glenea interrupta Thomson, 1860
- Glenea iphia Pascoe, 1867
- Glenea iresine Pascoe, 1867
- Glenea iridescens Pascoe, 1867
- Glenea iriei Hayashi, 1971
- Glenea iwasakii Kono, 1933
- Glenea jeanvoinei Pic, 1927
- Glenea johani Hüdepohl, 1996
- Glenea johnstoni Gahan, 1902
- Glenea joliveti Breuning, 1970
- Glenea kinabaluensis Fisher, 1935
- Glenea kusamai Makihara, 1988
- Glenea labuanensis Breuning, 1956
- Glenea lachrymosa Pascoe, 1867
- Glenea laosensis Breuning, 1956
- Glenea latevittata Aurivillius, 1920
- Glenea laudata Pascoe, 1867
- Glenea lefebvrei (Guérin-Méneville, 1831)
- Glenea lepida Newman, 1842
- Glenea leucomaculata Breuning, 1968
- Glenea licenti Pic, 1939
- Glenea lineata Gahan, 1897
- Glenea lineatocollis Thomson, 1860
- Glenea loosdregti Breuning, 1965
- Glenea lugubris Thomson, 1865
- Glenea lunulata Jordan, 1894
- Glenea lycoris Thomson, 1865
- Glenea malasiaca Thomson, 1865
- Glenea manto Pascoe, 1866
- Glenea masakii Makihara, 1978
- Glenea matangensis Aurivillius, 1911
- Glenea mathematica (Thomson, 1857)
- Glenea medea Pascoe, 1867
- Glenea melia Pascoe, 1867
- Glenea melissa Pascoe, 1867
- Glenea mephisto Thomson, 1879
- Glenea mesoleuca Pascoe, 1867
- Glenea mimoscalaris Breuning, 1969
- Glenea minerva Aurivillius, 1922
- Glenea miniacea Pascoe, 1867
- Glenea mira Jordan, 1903
- Glenea montivaga Gahan, 1909
- Glenea montrouzieri Thomson, 1865
- Glenea mouhoti Thomson, 1865
- Glenea moultoni Aurivillius, 1913
- Glenea mounieri Breuning, 1956
- Glenea moutrouzieri Thomson, 1865
- Glenea multiguttata (Guérin-Méneville, 1843)
- Glenea myrsine Pascoe, 1867
- Glenea negrosiana Hüdepohl, 1996
- Glenea newmani Thomson, 1874
- Glenea nicanor Pascoe, 1867
- Glenea nigeriae Aurivillius, 1920
- Glenea nigrifrons Aurivillius, 1920
- Glenea nigroapicalis Breuning, 1956
- Glenea nigrotibialis Breuning, 1950
- Glenea niobe J. Thomson, 1879
- Glenea nitidicollis Aurivillius, 1920
- Glenea niveipectus Aurivillius, 1926
- Glenea nobilis Schwarzer, 1931
- Glenea novemguttata (Guérin-Méneville, 1831)
- Glenea ochraceolineata Schwarzer, 1931
- Glenea ochraceovittata J. Thomson, 1865
- Glenea ochreicollis Breuning, 1950
- Glenea ochreobivittata Breuning, 1956
- Glenea ochreosuturalis Breuning, 1958
- Glenea ochreovittata Breuning, 1950
- Glenea ochreovittipennis Breuning, 1958
- Glenea octoguttata Breuning, 1956
- Glenea octomaculata Aurivillius, 1927
- Glenea oeme Pascoe, 1866
- Glenea oemeoides Breuning, 1950
- Glenea olbrechtsi Breuning, 1952
- Glenea omeiensis Chiang, 1963
- Glenea oriformis Breuning, 1958
- Glenea ossifera Jordan, 1894
- Glenea pagana Aurivillius, 1926
- Glenea papuensis Gahan, 1897
- Glenea paracarneipes Breuning, 1977
- Glenea paradiana Lin & Montreuil, 2009
- Glenea parahumerointerrupta Breuning, 1982
- Glenea paralepida Breuning, 1980
- Glenea paramephisto Breuning, 1972
- Glenea paramounieri Breuning, 1982
- Glenea parartensis Breuning, 1966
- Glenea parasauteri Breuning, 1980
- Glenea parasuavis Breuning, 1982
- Glenea parexculta Breuning, 1980
- Glenea pascoei Aurivillius, 1923
- Glenea pendleburyi Fisher, 1935
- Glenea peregoi Breuning, 1949
- Glenea peria Thomson, 1865
- Glenea philippensis Breuning, 1958
- Glenea pici Aurivillius, 1925
- Glenea pieliana Gressitt, 1939
- Glenea plagiata Gardner, 1930
- Glenea plagicollis Aurivillius, 1925
- Glenea plagifera Aurivillius, 1913
- Glenea posticata Gahan, 1895
- Glenea problematica Lin & Yang, 2009
- Glenea propinqua Gahan, 1897
- Glenea proserpina J. Thomson, 1865
- Glenea proxima Lameere, 1893
- Glenea pseudadelia Breuning, 1956
- Glenea pseudocaninia Lin & Montreuil, 2009
- Glenea pseudocolobotheoides Breuning, 1950
- Glenea pseudogiraffa Báguena & Breuning, 1958
- Glenea pseudoindiana Lin & Yang, 2009
- Glenea pseudolaudata Breuning, 1956
- Glenea pseudomephisto Breuning, 1969
- Glenea pseudomyrsine Breuning, 1956
- Glenea pseudopuella Breuning, 1958
- Glenea pseudoregularis Breuning, 1956
- Glenea pseudoscalaris (Fairmaire, 1895)
- Glenea pseudosuavis Breuning, 1956
- Glenea puella Chevrolat, 1858
- Glenea pujoli Breuning, 1970
- Glenea pulchella Pascoe, 1858
- Glenea pulchra Aurivillius, 1926
- Glenea pustulata J. Thomson, 1865
- Glenea quadriochreomaculata Breuning, 1966
- Glenea quatuordecimmaculata (Hope, 1831)
- Glenea quatuordecimpunctata Breuning, 1956
- Glenea quezonica Hüdepohl, 1996
- Glenea quinquelineata Chevrolat, 1855
- Glenea quinquevittata Aurivillius, 1926
- Glenea referens Aurivillius, 1926
- Glenea regularis Newman, 1842
- Glenea relicta Pascoe, 1868
- Glenea robinsoni Gahan, 1906
- Glenea rondoni Breuning, 1963
- Glenea rubripennis Breuning, 1961
- Glenea rubrobasicornis Breuning, 1962
- Glenea rufa Breuning, 1956
- Glenea rufifrons Aurivillius, 1920
- Glenea rufipes Gressitt, 1939
- Glenea rufobasaloides Breuning, 1961
- Glenea rufuloantennata Breuning, 1966
- Glenea samarensis Aurivillius, 1926
- Glenea sanctaemariae (Thomson, 1857)
- Glenea sangirensis Breuning, 1956
- Glenea saperdoides J. Thomson, 1860
- Glenea scalaris Thomson, 1865
- Glenea schwarzeri Fisher, 1935
- Glenea sedecimmaculata Breuning, 1950
- Glenea sejuncta Pascoe, 1867
- Glenea selangorensis Breuning, 1961
- Glenea sexguttata Aurivillius, 1925
- Glenea sexnotata Gahan, 1889
- Glenea sexplagiata Aurivillius, 1913
- Glenea sexvitticollis Breuning, 1950
- Glenea sikkimensis Breuning, 1982
- Glenea sjoestedti Aurivillius, 1903
- Glenea smaragdina Breuning, 1956
- Glenea sordida Aurivillius, 1924
- Glenea splendidula Hüdepohl, 1996
- Glenea strigata Thomson, 1860
- Glenea suavis Newman, 1842
- Glenea subadelia Breuning, 1969
- Glenea subelegantissima Breuning, 1982
- Glenea subgrisea Breuning, 1958
- Glenea subhuonora Breuning, 1956
- Glenea submajor Breuning, 1960
- Glenea subregularis Pic, 1943
- Glenea subsimilis Gahan, 1897
- Glenea substellata Breuning, 1956
- Glenea subviridescens Breuning, 1963 inq.
- Glenea suensoni Heyrovský, 1939
- Glenea sulphurea Thomson, 1865
- Glenea sulphuroides Breuning, 1982
- Glenea suturalis Jordan, 1894
- Glenea suturata Gressitt, 1939
- Glenea suturefasciata Breuning, 1956
- Glenea suturevittata Breuning, 1958
- Glenea sylvia Thomson, 1879
- Glenea t-notata Gahan, 1889
- Glenea taeniata J. Thomson, 1860
- Glenea telmissa Pascoe, 1867
- Glenea tenuilineata Breuning, 1956
- Glenea thomsoni Pascoe, 1867
- Glenea transversefasciata Hüdepohl, 1996
- Glenea transversevittipennis Breuning, 1956
- Glenea triangulifera Aurivillius, 1926
- Glenea trimaculipennis Breuning, 1959
- Glenea tringaria Pascoe, 1867
- Glenea tritoleuca Aurivillius, 1924
- Glenea trivittata Aurivillius, 1911
- Glenea truncatipennis Breuning, 1956
- Glenea univittata Aurivillius, 1924
- Glenea ustulata Breuning, 1956
- Glenea varifascia Thomson, 1865
- Glenea venusta (Guérin-Méneville, 1831)
- Glenea vietnamana Breuning, 1972
- Glenea vigintiduomaculata (Thomson, 1858)
- Glenea vingerhoedti Téocchi & Sudre, 2003
- Glenea viridescens Pic, 1927
- Glenea vittulata Aurivillius, 1920
- Glenea voluptuosa Thomson, 1860
- Glenea wallacei Gahan, 1897
- Glenea wegneri Gilmour & Breuning, 1963
- Glenea weigeli Lin & Liu, 2012
- Glenea wiedenfeldi Aurivillius, 1911
- Glenea x-nigrum Aurivillius, 1913
- Glenea xanthotaenia Gestro, 1875
- Glenea annulicornis
- Glenea apicespinosa
- Glenea bastiana
- Glenea beesoni
- Glenea bimaculatithorax
- Glenea coomani
- Glenea crucifera
- Glenea delolorata
- Glenea didymoides
- Glenea diversenotata
- Glenea fainanensis
- Glenea flavosignata
- Glenea formosana
- Glenea formosensis
- Glenea hachijonis
- Glenea hauseri
- Glenea heikichii
- Glenea horiensis
- Glenea hwasiana
- Glenea ihai
- Glenea inlineata
- Glenea izuinsulana
- Glenea lacteomaculata
- Glenea lecta
- Glenea luteicollis
- Glenea luteosignata
- Glenea magdelainei
- Glenea mitonoana
- Glenea mussardi
- Glenea nanshanchiana
- Glenea nigerrima
- Glenea nigra
- Glenea obliqua
- Glenea ornata
- Glenea pallidipes
- Glenea papiliomaculata
- Glenea pseudoluctuosa
- Glenea saperdiformis
- Glenea semiluctuosa
- Glenea siamensis
- Glenea silhetica
- Glenea subabbreviata
- Glenea tatsienlui
- Glenea tonkinea
- Glenea virens
- Glenea zalinensis
