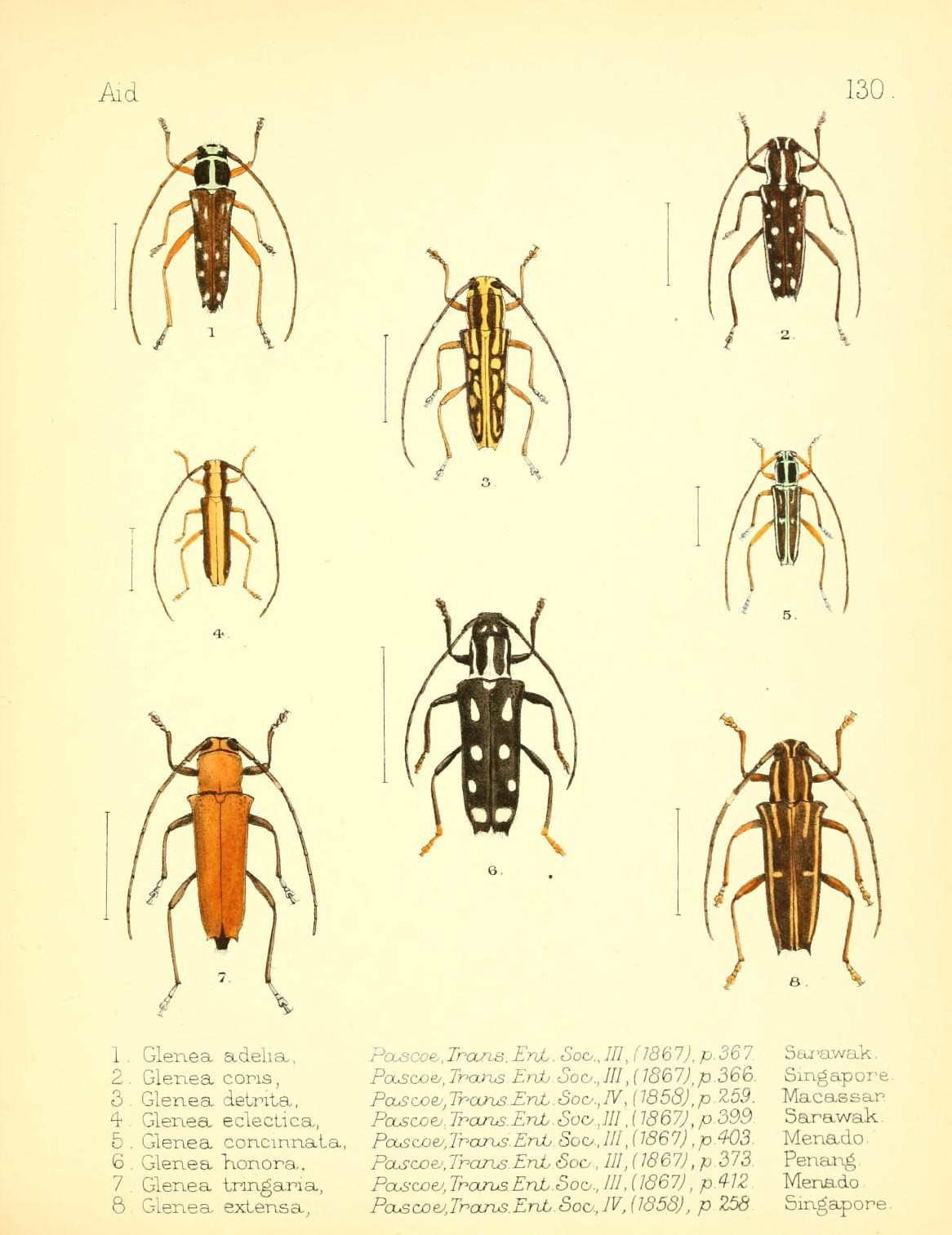
- 7 . Glenea tringaria

Scientific classification
- Kingdom: Animalia
- Phylum: Arthropoda
- Clade: Pancrustacea
- Class: Insecta
- Order: Coleoptera
- Suborder: Polyphaga
- Infraorder: Cucujiformia
- Family: Cerambycidae
- Genus: Glenea
- Species: G. tringaria

Binomial name
- Glenea tringaria Pascoe, 1867

= Glenea tringaria =

Species of beetle

Glenea tringaria is a species of beetle in the family Cerambycidae. It was described by Francis Polkinghorne Pascoe in 1867. It is known from Sulawesi.
