= Glenea iridescens =

Scientific classification
- Kingdom: Animalia
- Phylum: Arthropoda
- Class: Insecta
- Order: Coleoptera
- Suborder: Polyphaga
- Infraorder: Cucujiformia
- Family: Cerambycidae
- Genus: Glenea
- Species: G. iridescens

Binomial name
- Glenea iridescens Pascoe, 1867

Species of beetle

Glenea iridescens is a species of beetle in the family Cerambycidae. It was described by Francis Polkinghorne Pascoe in 1867. It can be found in Borneo and Malaysia.

== Varietas ==
- Glenea iridescens var. aerata Aurivillius, 1922
- Glenea iridescens var. rufofemorata Breuning, 1956
