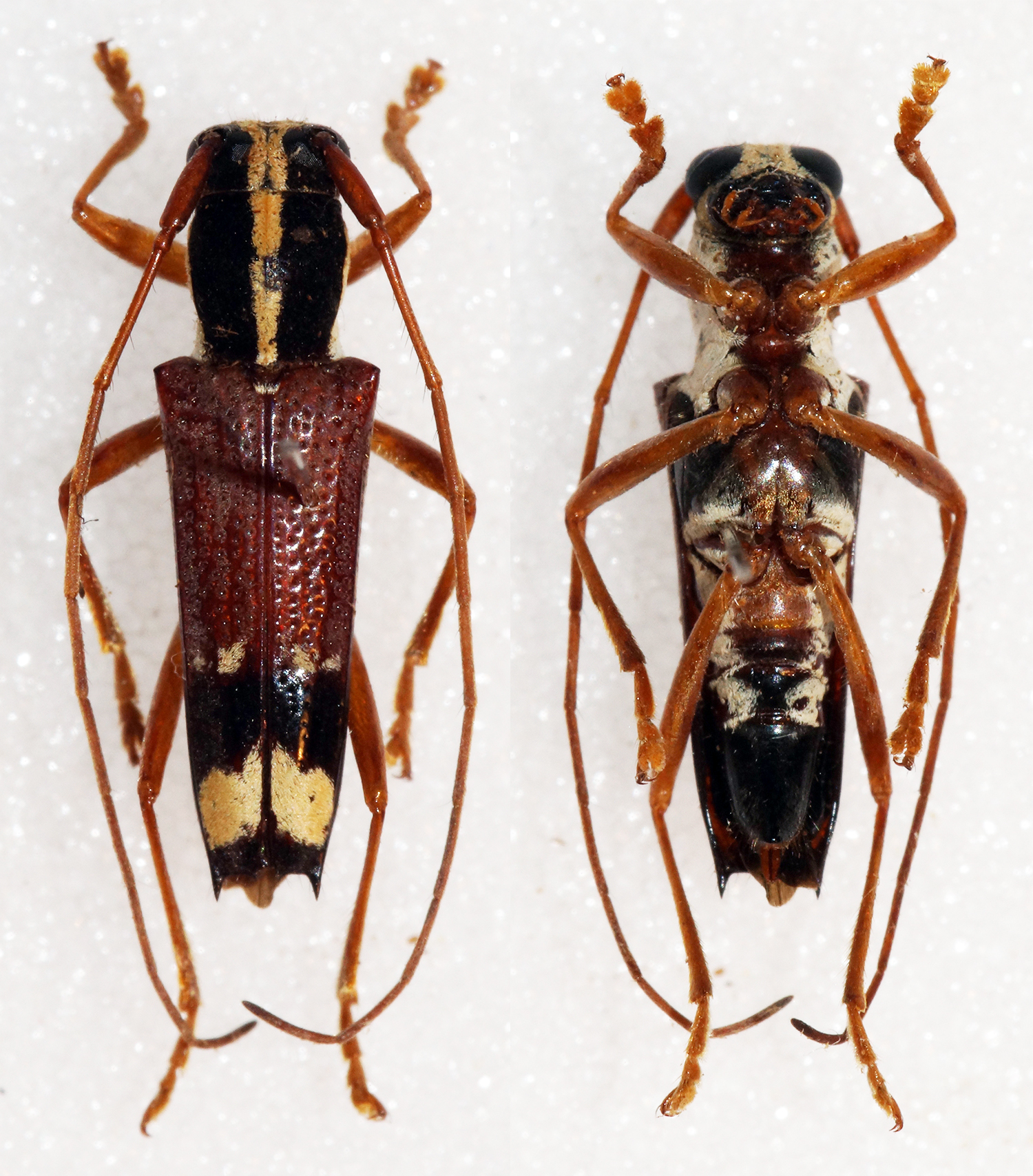

Scientific classification
- Kingdom: Animalia
- Phylum: Arthropoda
- Class: Insecta
- Order: Coleoptera
- Suborder: Polyphaga
- Infraorder: Cucujiformia
- Family: Cerambycidae
- Genus: Glenea
- Species: G. dimidiata

Binomial name
- Glenea dimidiata (Fabricius, 1801)

Synonyms
- Stibara oudetera J. Thomson, 1857; Glenea udetera (Thomson) Pascoe, 1866 (misspelling)

= Glenea dimidiata =

Species of beetle

Glenea dimidiata is a species of beetle in the family Cerambycidae. It was described by Johan Christian Fabricius in 1801.

== Distribution ==
It is known from Malaysia and Indonesia.

== Subspecies ==
- Glenea dimidiata arcuatefasciata Pic, 1943
- Glenea dimidiata dimidiata (Fabricius, 1801)
- Glenea dimidiata semigrisea Aurivillius, 1913
- Glenea dimidiata sumbawana Aurivillius, 1925
