= Glenea diverselineata =

Scientific classification
- Kingdom: Animalia
- Phylum: Arthropoda
- Class: Insecta
- Order: Coleoptera
- Suborder: Polyphaga
- Infraorder: Cucujiformia
- Family: Cerambycidae
- Genus: Glenea
- Species: G. diverselineata

Binomial name
- Glenea diverselineata Pic, 1926

Species of beetle

Glenea diverselineata is a species of beetle in the family Cerambycidae. It was described by Maurice Pic in 1926.

== Subspecies ==
- Glenea diverselineata birmanica Breuning, 1956
- Glenea diverselineata diverselineata Pic, 1926
- Glenea diverselineata intermedia Breuning, 1968
