= Glenea chujoi =

Scientific classification
- Domain: Eukaryota
- Kingdom: Animalia
- Phylum: Arthropoda
- Class: Insecta
- Order: Coleoptera
- Suborder: Polyphaga
- Infraorder: Cucujiformia
- Family: Cerambycidae
- Genus: Glenea
- Species: G. chujoi

Binomial name
- Glenea chujoi Mitono, 1937

Species of beetle

Glenea chujoi is a species of beetle in the family Cerambycidae. It was described by Mitono in 1937.
