= Glenea sordida =

Scientific classification
- Domain: Eukaryota
- Kingdom: Animalia
- Phylum: Arthropoda
- Class: Insecta
- Order: Coleoptera
- Suborder: Polyphaga
- Infraorder: Cucujiformia
- Family: Cerambycidae
- Genus: Glenea
- Species: G. sordida

Binomial name
- Glenea sordida Aurivillius, 1924

Species of beetle

Glenea sordida is a species of beetle in the family Cerambycidae. It was described by Per Olof Christopher Aurivillius in 1924.
