= Glenea ochraceolineata =

Scientific classification
- Kingdom: Animalia
- Phylum: Arthropoda
- Class: Insecta
- Order: Coleoptera
- Suborder: Polyphaga
- Infraorder: Cucujiformia
- Family: Cerambycidae
- Genus: Glenea
- Species: G. ochraceolineata

Binomial name
- Glenea ochraceolineata Schwarzer, 1931

Species of beetle

Glenea ochraceolineata is a species of beetle in the family Cerambycidae. It was described by Bernhard Schwarzer in 1931. It is known from Malaysia and Borneo.
