= Glenea maculicollis =

Scientific classification
- Kingdom: Animalia
- Phylum: Arthropoda
- Class: Insecta
- Order: Coleoptera
- Suborder: Polyphaga
- Infraorder: Cucujiformia
- Family: Cerambycidae
- Genus: Glenea
- Species: G. maculicollis

Binomial name
- Glenea maculicollis Breuning, 1950

Species of beetle

Glenea maculicollis is a species of beetle in the family Cerambycidae. It was described by Stephan von Breuning in 1950. It is known from Borneo.
