= Glenea lacteomaculata =

Scientific classification
- Domain: Eukaryota
- Kingdom: Animalia
- Phylum: Arthropoda
- Class: Insecta
- Order: Coleoptera
- Suborder: Polyphaga
- Infraorder: Cucujiformia
- Family: Cerambycidae
- Genus: Glenea
- Species: G. lacteomaculata

Binomial name
- Glenea lacteomaculata Schwarzer, 1925

Species of beetle

Glenea lacteomaculata is a species of beetle in the family Cerambycidae.
