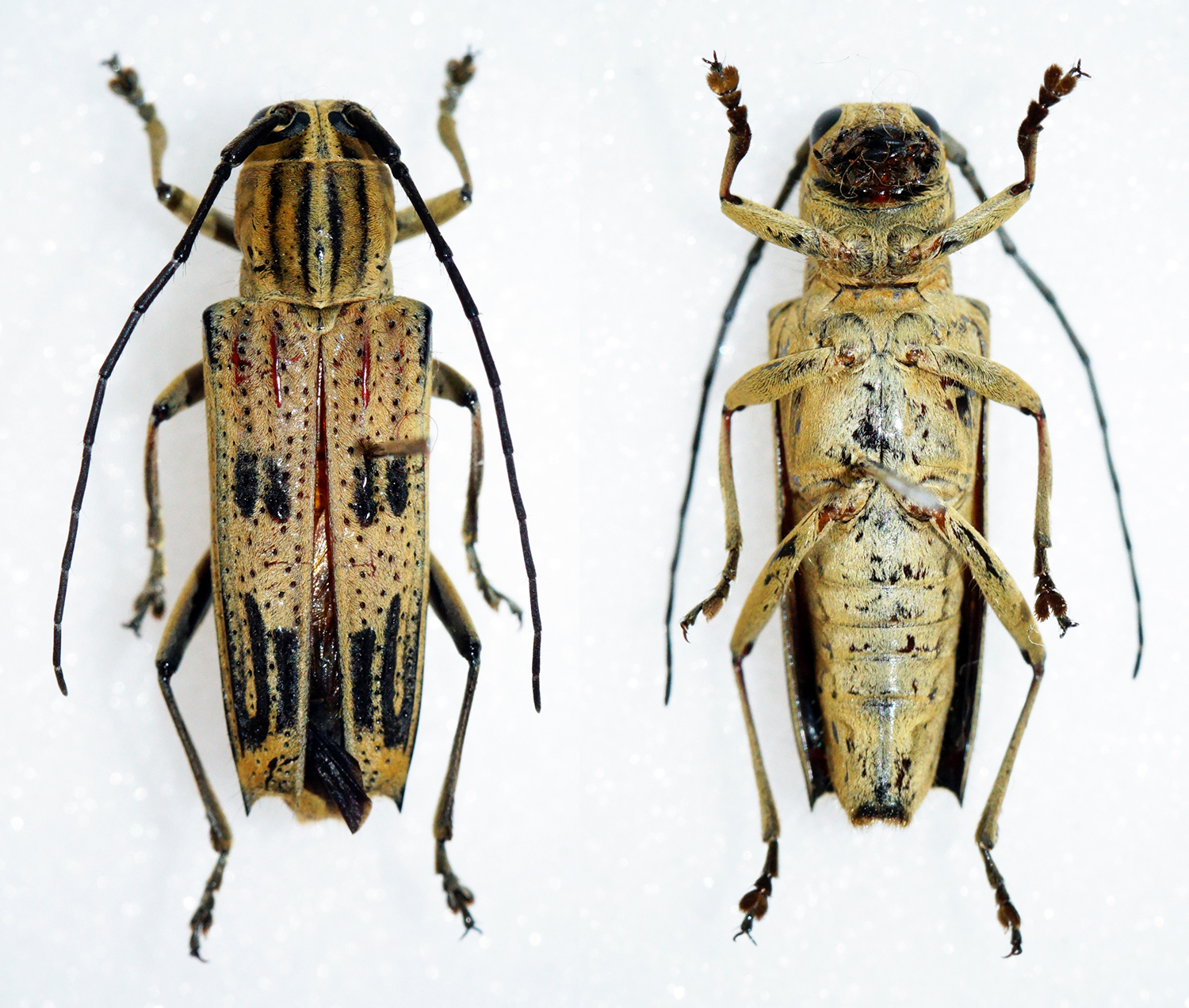

Scientific classification
- Kingdom: Animalia
- Phylum: Arthropoda
- Clade: Pancrustacea
- Class: Insecta
- Order: Coleoptera
- Suborder: Polyphaga
- Infraorder: Cucujiformia
- Family: Cerambycidae
- Genus: Glenea
- Species: G. quadrinotata

Binomial name
- Glenea quadrinotata Guérin-Méneville, 1843

Synonyms
- Cerambyx quadrinotata Guerin, 1843; Glenea nigrolineata Gahan, 1894

= Glenea quadrinotata =

Species of beetle

Glenea quadrinotata is a species of beetle in the family Cerambycidae. It was described by Félix Édouard Guérin-Méneville in 1843. It is known from Myanmar, Malaysia, Laos, India, and Thailand.
