= Glenea obliqua =

Scientific classification
- Domain: Eukaryota
- Kingdom: Animalia
- Phylum: Arthropoda
- Class: Insecta
- Order: Coleoptera
- Suborder: Polyphaga
- Infraorder: Cucujiformia
- Family: Cerambycidae
- Genus: Glenea
- Species: G. obliqua

Binomial name
- Glenea obliqua Gressitt, 1939

Species of beetle

Glenea obliqua is a species of beetle in the family Cerambycidae.
