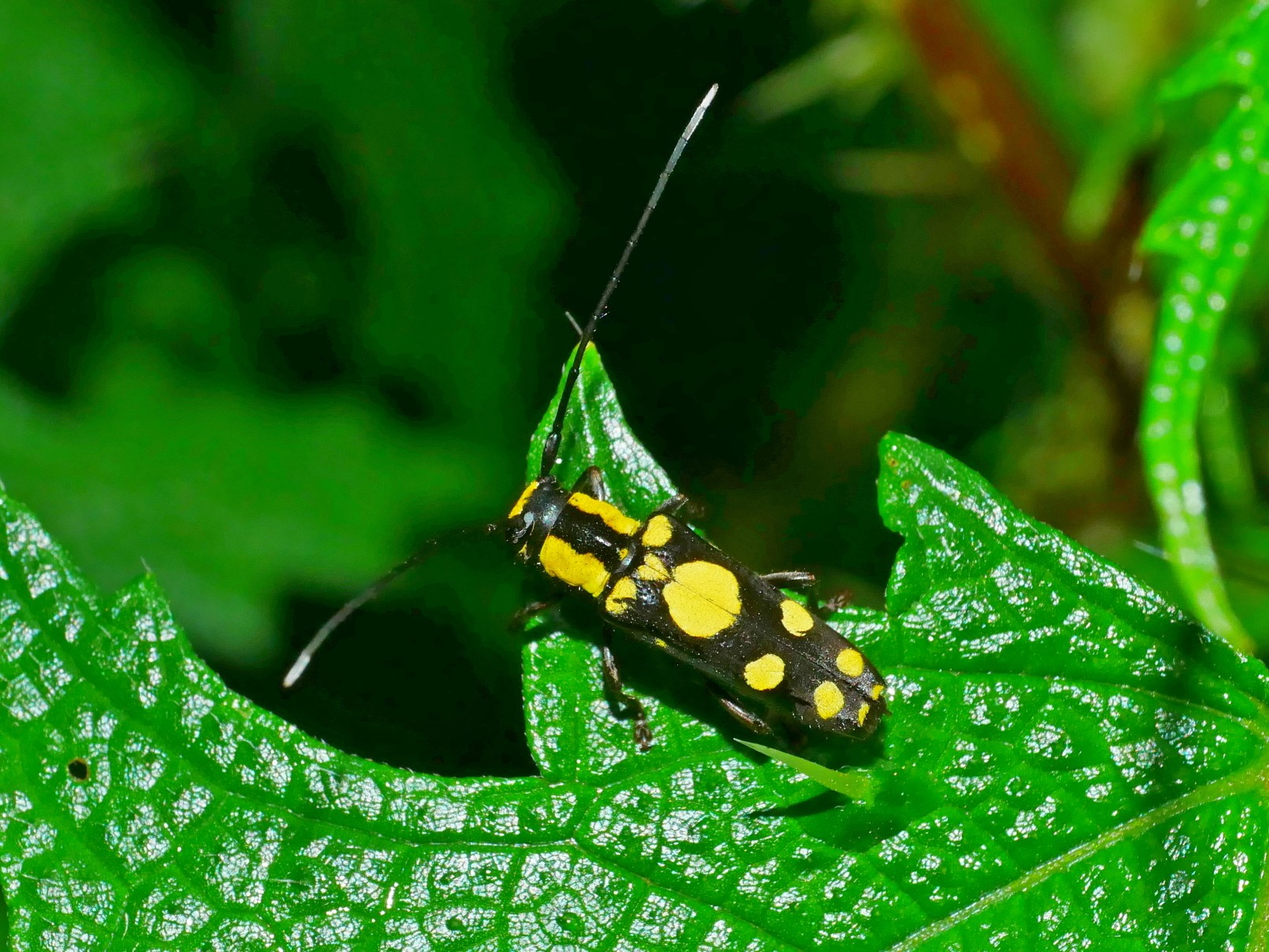

Scientific classification
- Domain: Eukaryota
- Kingdom: Animalia
- Phylum: Arthropoda
- Class: Insecta
- Order: Coleoptera
- Suborder: Polyphaga
- Infraorder: Cucujiformia
- Family: Cerambycidae
- Genus: Glenea
- Species: G. mitonoana

Binomial name
- Glenea mitonoana Gressitt, 1951

Synonyms
- Glenea issikii subsp. ornata Mitono, 1934; Glenea issikii var. ornata Mitono, 1934; Glenea (Glenea) mitonoana Breuning, 1956; Glenea ornata Mitono, 1941

= Glenea mitonoana =

Species of beetle

Glenea mitonoana is a species of beetle in the family Cerambycidae.
