= Glenea xanthotaenia =

Scientific classification
- Domain: Eukaryota
- Kingdom: Animalia
- Phylum: Arthropoda
- Class: Insecta
- Order: Coleoptera
- Suborder: Polyphaga
- Infraorder: Cucujiformia
- Family: Cerambycidae
- Genus: Glenea
- Species: G. xanthotaenia

Binomial name
- Glenea xanthotaenia Gestro, 1875

Synonyms
- Glenea xanthotaenia m. novaguineae Breuning, 1958

Species of beetle

Glenea xanthotaenia is a species of beetle in the family Cerambycidae. It was described by Gestro in 1875. It is known from Papua New Guinea.
