= Glenea weigeli =

Scientific classification
- Domain: Eukaryota
- Kingdom: Animalia
- Phylum: Arthropoda
- Class: Insecta
- Order: Coleoptera
- Suborder: Polyphaga
- Infraorder: Cucujiformia
- Family: Cerambycidae
- Genus: Glenea
- Species: G. weigeli

Binomial name
- Glenea weigeli Lin & Liu, 2012

Species of beetle

Glenea weigeli is a species of beetle in the family Cerambycidae. It was described by Lin and Liu in 2012.
