= Glenea scopifera =

Scientific classification
- Domain: Eukaryota
- Kingdom: Animalia
- Phylum: Arthropoda
- Class: Insecta
- Order: Coleoptera
- Suborder: Polyphaga
- Infraorder: Cucujiformia
- Family: Cerambycidae
- Genus: Glenea
- Species: G. scopifera

Binomial name
- Glenea scopifera Pascoe, 1859

Species of beetle

Glenea scopifera is a species of beetle in the family Cerambycidae. It was described by Francis Polkinghorne Pascoe in 1859.
