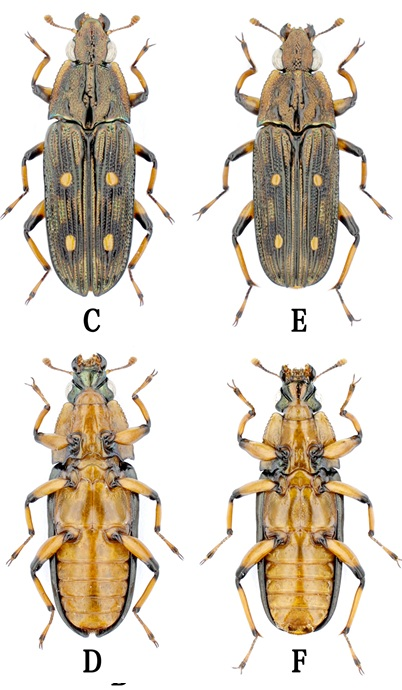
- C, D: female; E, F: male

Scientific classification
- Domain: Eukaryota
- Kingdom: Animalia
- Phylum: Arthropoda
- Class: Insecta
- Order: Coleoptera
- Suborder: Polyphaga
- Infraorder: Cucujiformia
- Family: Helotidae
- Genus: Helota
- Species: H. thoracica

Binomial name
- Helota thoracica Ritsema, 1895

= Helota thoracica =

Species of beetle

Helota thoracica is a species of beetle of the Helotidae family. This species is found in China (Sichuan, Jiangxi, Fujian, Chongqing, Hainan), Taiwan, Vietnam, Laos and Thailand.

Adults have been recorded on weeping willows with sap exuding from the trees, and they were observed feeding on this sap.
