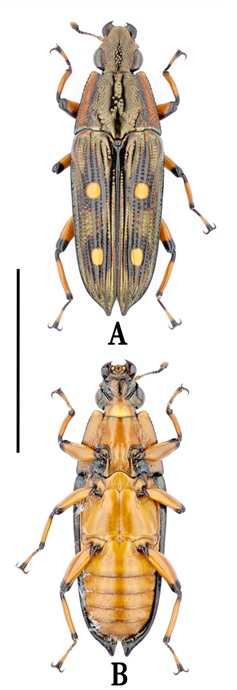

Scientific classification
- Domain: Eukaryota
- Kingdom: Animalia
- Phylum: Arthropoda
- Class: Insecta
- Order: Coleoptera
- Suborder: Polyphaga
- Infraorder: Cucujiformia
- Family: Helotidae
- Genus: Helota
- Species: H. feai

Binomial name
- Helota feai Ritsema, 1891

= Helota feai =

Species of beetle

Helota feai is a species of beetle of the Helotidae family. This species is found in China (Yunnan), Myanmar, Laos and Thailand.
