= Glenea keili =

Scientific classification
- Domain: Eukaryota
- Kingdom: Animalia
- Phylum: Arthropoda
- Class: Insecta
- Order: Coleoptera
- Suborder: Polyphaga
- Infraorder: Cucujiformia
- Family: Cerambycidae
- Genus: Glenea
- Species: G. keili

Binomial name
- Glenea keili Ritsema, 1897

Species of beetle

Glenea keili is a species of beetle in the family Cerambycidae. It was described by Coenraad Ritsema in 1897. It contains the varietas Glenea keili var. pyrrha.
