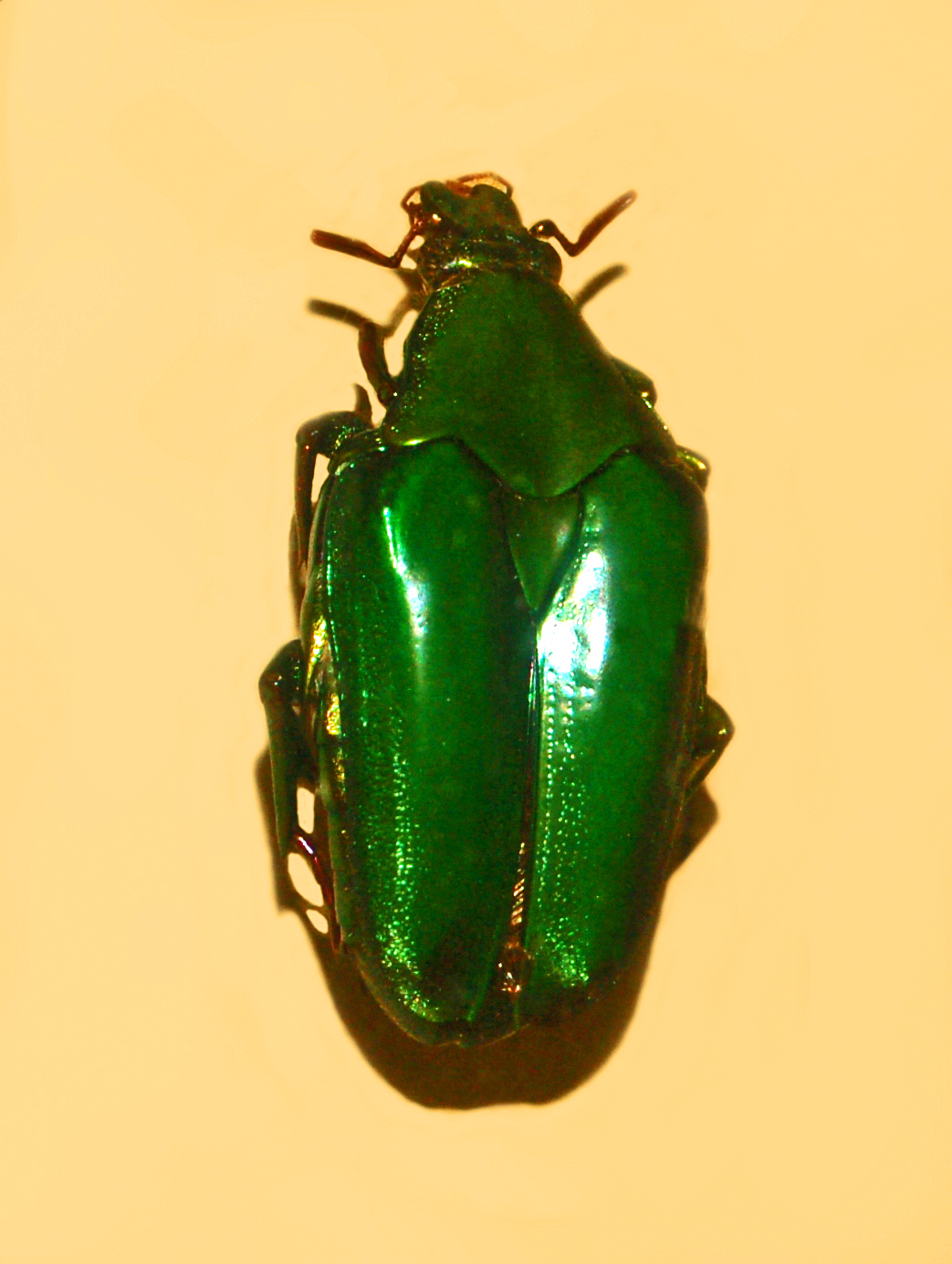
- Pseudochalcothea virens from Sumatra.

Scientific classification
- Kingdom: Animalia
- Phylum: Arthropoda
- Clade: Pancrustacea
- Class: Insecta
- Order: Coleoptera
- Suborder: Polyphaga
- Infraorder: Scarabaeiformia
- Family: Scarabaeidae
- Genus: Pseudochalcothea
- Species: P. virens

Binomial name
- Pseudochalcothea virens Ritsema, 1879

Synonyms
- Chalcothea virens Ritsema, 1879

= Pseudochalcothea virens =

Species of beetle

Pseudochalcothea virens is a species of beetles of the family Scarabaeidae and subfamily Cetoniinae.

== Description ==
Pseudochalcothea virens can reach about 30 millimetres (1.2 in) in length and a breadth of about 15 millimetres (0.59 in) at the shoulders. Upper surface is completely green and the antennae and palpi are brown.

== Distribution ==
This species occurs in Sumatra.
