= Nephelotus aurivillii =

Scientific classification
- Domain: Eukaryota
- Kingdom: Animalia
- Phylum: Arthropoda
- Class: Insecta
- Order: Coleoptera
- Suborder: Polyphaga
- Infraorder: Cucujiformia
- Family: Cerambycidae
- Tribe: Lamiini
- Genus: Nephelotus
- Species: N. aurivillii

Binomial name
- Nephelotus aurivillii Ritsema, 1914

Species of beetle

Nephelotus aurivillii is a species of beetle in the family Cerambycidae. It was described by Coenraad Ritsema in 1914. It is known from Sumatra.
