= Glenea hasselti =

Scientific classification
- Domain: Eukaryota
- Kingdom: Animalia
- Phylum: Arthropoda
- Class: Insecta
- Order: Coleoptera
- Suborder: Polyphaga
- Infraorder: Cucujiformia
- Family: Cerambycidae
- Genus: Glenea
- Species: G. hasselti

Binomial name
- Glenea hasselti Ritsema, 1892

Species of beetle

Glenea hasselti is a species of beetle in the family Cerambycidae. It was described by Coenraad Ritsema in 1892. It is known from Sumatra.
