= Tetraglenes diuroides =

Scientific classification
- Domain: Eukaryota
- Kingdom: Animalia
- Phylum: Arthropoda
- Class: Insecta
- Order: Coleoptera
- Suborder: Polyphaga
- Infraorder: Cucujiformia
- Family: Cerambycidae
- Genus: Tetraglenes
- Species: T. diuroides

Binomial name
- Tetraglenes diuroides Ritsema, 1885

Species of beetle

Tetraglenes diuroides is a species of beetle in the family Cerambycidae. It was described by Coenraad Ritsema in 1885.
