= Pelargoderus sijthoffii =

Scientific classification
- Kingdom: Animalia
- Phylum: Arthropoda
- Class: Insecta
- Order: Coleoptera
- Suborder: Polyphaga
- Infraorder: Cucujiformia
- Family: Cerambycidae
- Genus: Pelargoderus
- Species: P. sijthoffii

Binomial name
- Pelargoderus sijthoffii Ritsema, 1901

Synonyms
- Pelargoderus sijthoffi (Ritsema) Breuning, 1942 (misspelling)

Species of beetle

Pelargoderus sijthoffii is a species of beetle in the family Cerambycidae. It was described by Coenraad Ritsema in 1901.
