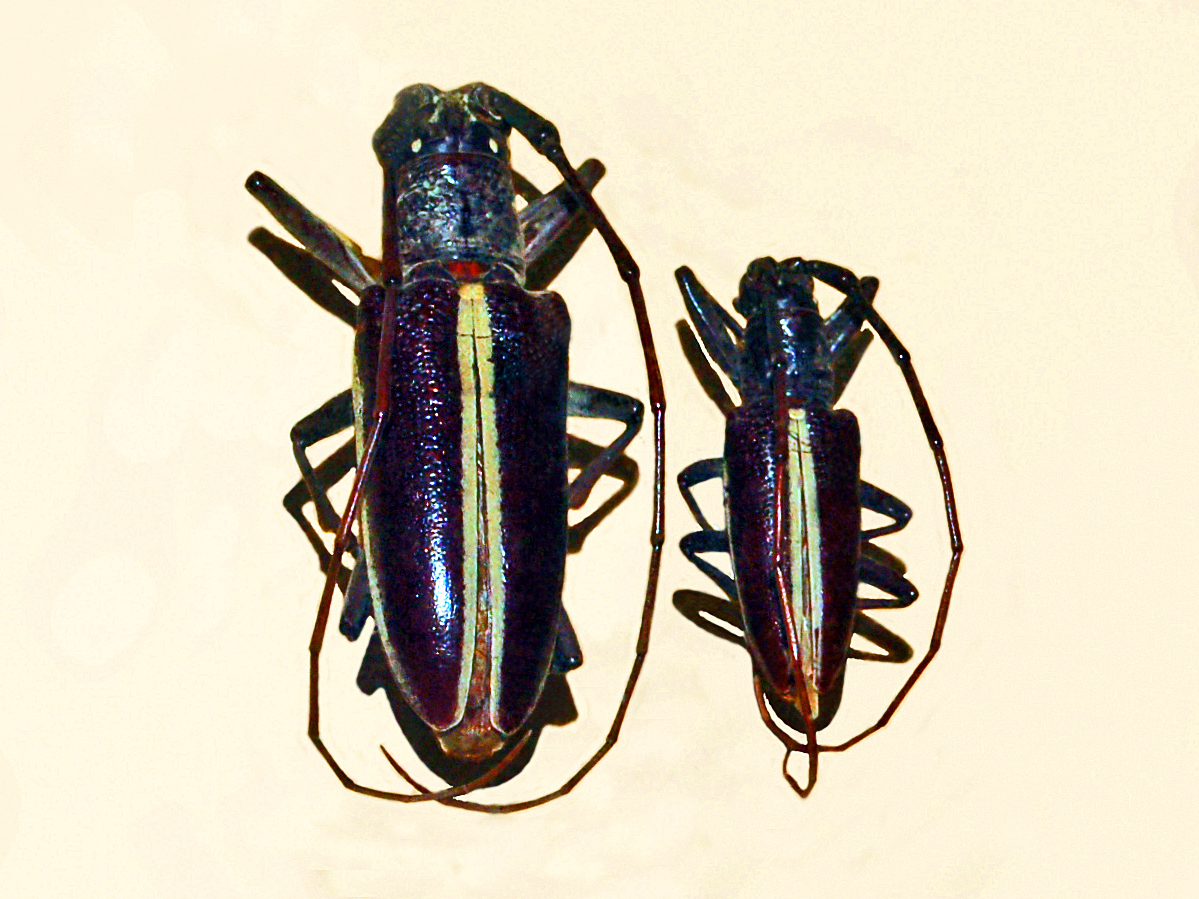
- Pelargoderus marginipennis from Enggano Island

Scientific classification
- Kingdom: Animalia
- Phylum: Arthropoda
- Class: Insecta
- Order: Coleoptera
- Suborder: Polyphaga
- Infraorder: Cucujiformia
- Family: Cerambycidae
- Genus: Pelargoderus
- Species: P. marginipennis

Binomial name
- Pelargoderus marginipennis Ritsema, 1895

Synonyms
- Pelargoderus trivittatus Aurivillius, 1907

= Pelargoderus marginipennis =

Species of beetle

Pelargoderus marginipennis is a species of beetle belonging to the family Cerambycidae.

== Description ==
Pelargoderus marginipennis can reach a length of about 29 millimetres (1.1 in).

== Distribution ==
This species can be found in Sumatra.
