= Thermonotus apicalis =

Scientific classification
- Kingdom: Animalia
- Phylum: Arthropoda
- Clade: Pancrustacea
- Class: Insecta
- Order: Coleoptera
- Suborder: Polyphaga
- Infraorder: Cucujiformia
- Family: Cerambycidae
- Genus: Thermonotus
- Species: T. apicalis

Binomial name
- Thermonotus apicalis Ritsema, 1881

Synonyms
- Cereopsius apicalis Ritsema, 1881

Species of beetle

Thermonotus apicalis is a species of beetle in the family Cerambycidae. It was described by Coenraad Ritsema in 1881. It is known from Sumatra and Java. It contains the varietas Thermonotus apicalis var. oberthueri.
