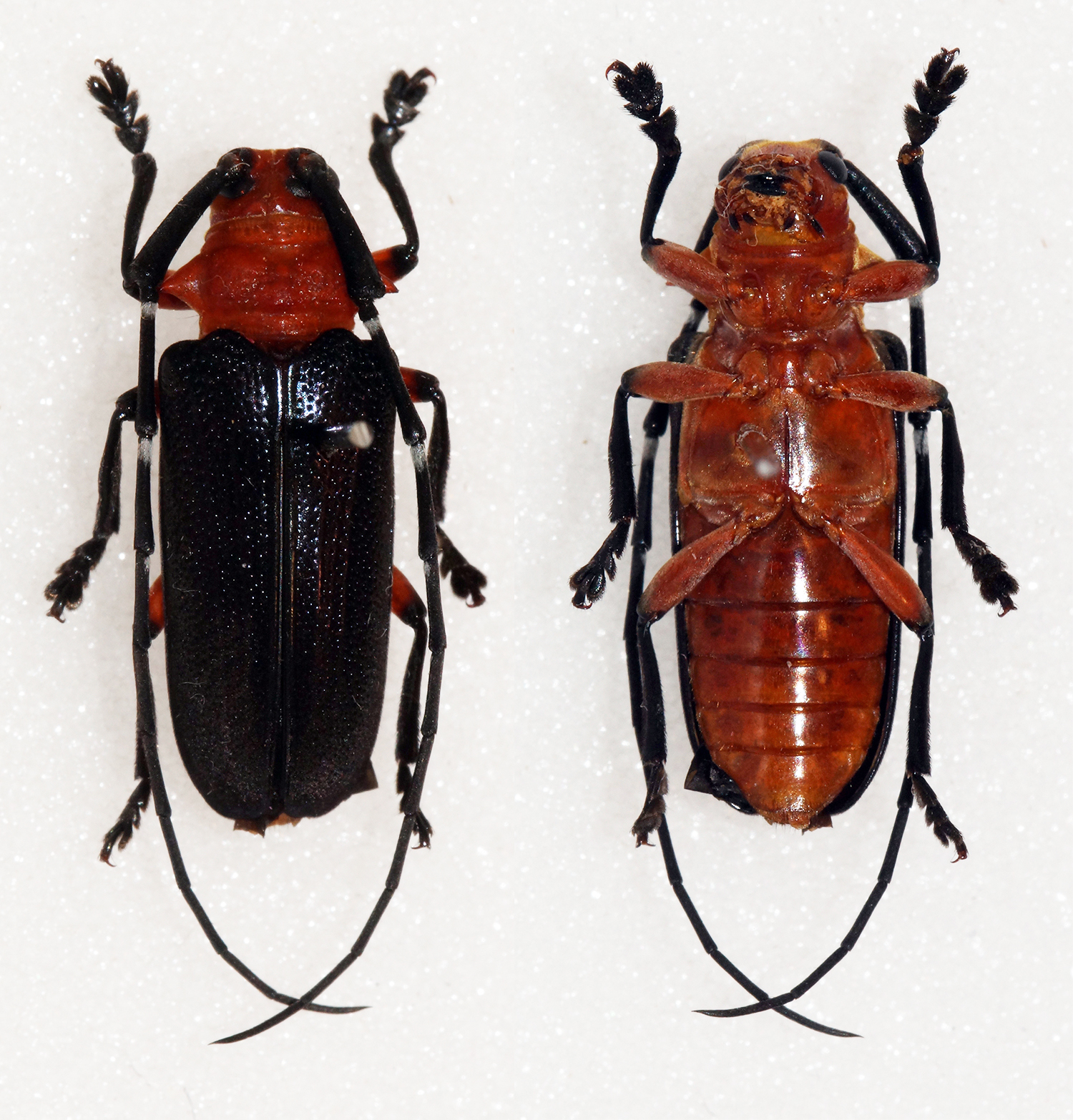
- Thermonotus nigripennis (male)

Scientific classification
- Kingdom: Animalia
- Phylum: Arthropoda
- Clade: Pancrustacea
- Class: Insecta
- Order: Coleoptera
- Suborder: Polyphaga
- Infraorder: Cucujiformia
- Family: Cerambycidae
- Genus: Thermonotus
- Species: T. nigripennis

Binomial name
- Thermonotus nigripennis Ritsema, 1896

= Thermonotus nigripennis =

Species of beetle

Thermonotus nigripennis is a species of beetle in the family Cerambycidae. It was described by Coenraad Ritsema in 1896. It is known from Malaysia, Brunei, Borneo and the Philippines.
