= Pelargoderus semitigrinus =

Scientific classification
- Kingdom: Animalia
- Phylum: Arthropoda
- Class: Insecta
- Order: Coleoptera
- Suborder: Polyphaga
- Infraorder: Cucujiformia
- Family: Cerambycidae
- Genus: Pelargoderus
- Species: P. semitigrinus

Binomial name
- Pelargoderus semitigrinus Ritsema, 1885

Species of beetle

Pelargoderus semitigrinus is a species of beetle in the family Cerambycidae. It was described by Coenraad Ritsema in 1885.
