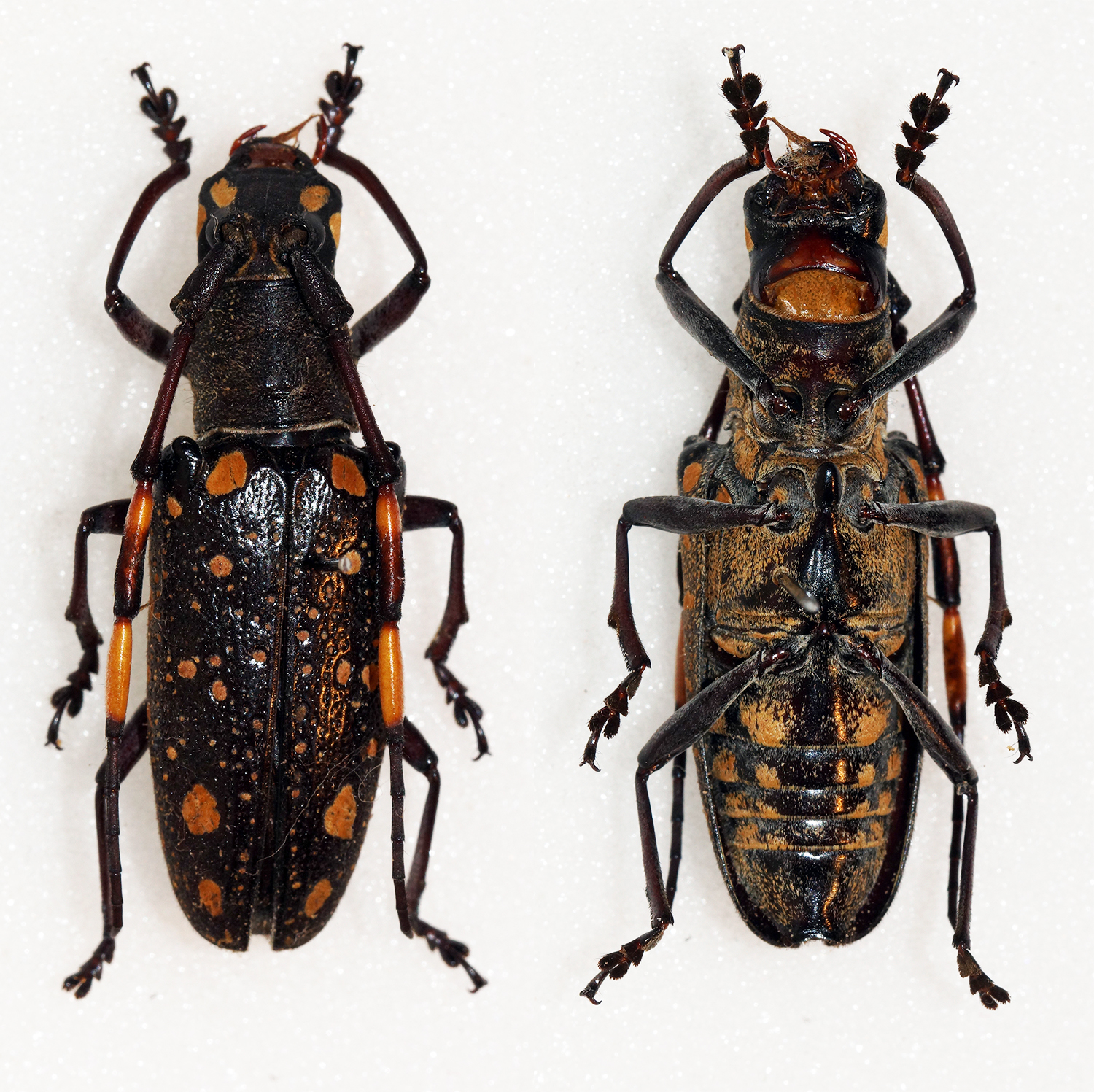

Scientific classification
- Kingdom: Animalia
- Phylum: Arthropoda
- Class: Insecta
- Order: Coleoptera
- Suborder: Polyphaga
- Infraorder: Cucujiformia
- Family: Cerambycidae
- Genus: Omocyrius
- Species: O. jansoni

Binomial name
- Omocyrius jansoni Ritsema, 1888

Synonyms
- Otarionomus invirgatus Heller, 1923

= Omocyrius jansoni =

Species of beetle

Omocyrius jansoni is a species of beetle in the family Cerambycidae. It was described by Coenraad Ritsema in 1888. It is known from Borneo.
