= Pelargoderus cincticornis =

Scientific classification
- Kingdom: Animalia
- Phylum: Arthropoda
- Class: Insecta
- Order: Coleoptera
- Suborder: Polyphaga
- Infraorder: Cucujiformia
- Family: Cerambycidae
- Genus: Pelargoderus
- Species: P. cincticornis

Binomial name
- Pelargoderus cincticornis Ritsema, 1895

Species of beetle

Pelargoderus cincticornis is a species of beetle in the family Cerambycidae. It was described by Coenraad Ritsema in 1895. It is known from Borneo.
