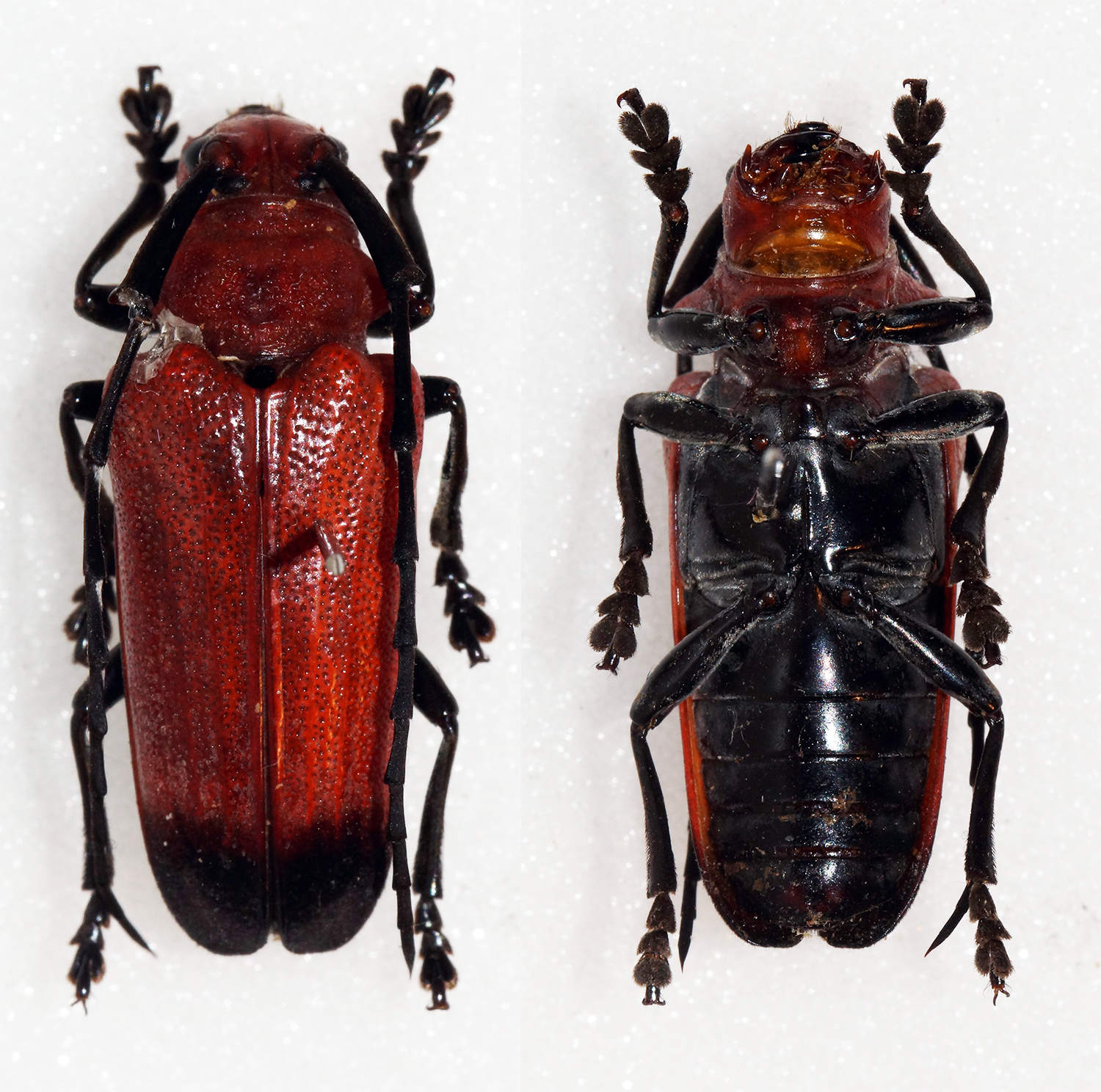

Scientific classification
- Kingdom: Animalia
- Phylum: Arthropoda
- Class: Insecta
- Order: Coleoptera
- Suborder: Polyphaga
- Infraorder: Cucujiformia
- Family: Cerambycidae
- Genus: Thermonotus
- Species: T. pasteuri

Binomial name
- Thermonotus pasteuri Ritsema, 1890

= Thermonotus pasteuri =

Species of beetle

Thermonotus pasteuri is a species of beetle in the family Cerambycidae. It was described by Coenraad Ritsema in 1890. It is known from Sumatra. It contains the varietas Thermonotus pasteuri var. nigroapicalis.
