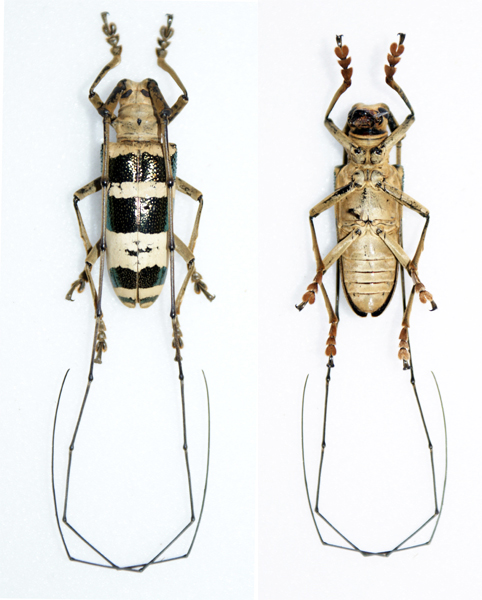

Scientific classification
- Kingdom: Animalia
- Phylum: Arthropoda
- Class: Insecta
- Order: Coleoptera
- Suborder: Polyphaga
- Infraorder: Cucujiformia
- Family: Cerambycidae
- Genus: Nemophas
- Species: N. ramosi

Binomial name
- Nemophas ramosi Schultze, 1920

Synonyms
- Nemophas subcylindricus ab. virescens Aurivillius, 1922; Nemophas rosenbergii ramosi Schultze, 1920

= Nemophas ramosi =

Species of beetle

Nemophas ramosi is a species of beetle in the family Cerambycidae. It was described by Schultze in 1920, originally as a subspecies of Nemophas rosenbergii. It is known from the Philippines.
