= Tetraglenes crassicornis =

Scientific classification
- Domain: Eukaryota
- Kingdom: Animalia
- Phylum: Arthropoda
- Class: Insecta
- Order: Coleoptera
- Suborder: Polyphaga
- Infraorder: Cucujiformia
- Family: Cerambycidae
- Genus: Tetraglenes
- Species: T. crassicornis

Binomial name
- Tetraglenes crassicornis Hintz, 1919

Species of beetle

Tetraglenes crassicornis is a species of beetle in the family Cerambycidae. It was described by Hintz in 1919.
