= Nemophas trifasciatus =

Scientific classification
- Kingdom: Animalia
- Phylum: Arthropoda
- Class: Insecta
- Order: Coleoptera
- Suborder: Polyphaga
- Infraorder: Cucujiformia
- Family: Cerambycidae
- Genus: Nemophas
- Species: N. trifasciatus

Binomial name
- Nemophas trifasciatus Heller, 1919

Species of beetle

Nemophas trifasciatus is a species of beetle in the family Cerambycidae. It was described by Heller in 1919. It is known from Moluccas.
