= Pelargoderus flavicornis =

Scientific classification
- Kingdom: Animalia
- Phylum: Arthropoda
- Class: Insecta
- Order: Coleoptera
- Suborder: Polyphaga
- Infraorder: Cucujiformia
- Family: Cerambycidae
- Genus: Pelargoderus
- Species: P. flavicornis

Binomial name
- Pelargoderus flavicornis Gahan, 1888

Species of beetle

Pelargoderus flavicornis is a species of beetle in the family Cerambycidae. It is known from Charles Joseph Gahan in 1888. It is known from Sumatra.
