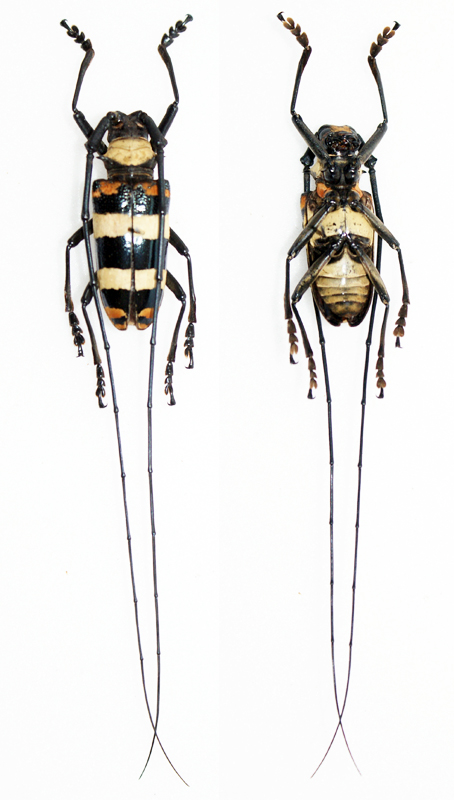

Scientific classification
- Kingdom: Animalia
- Phylum: Arthropoda
- Clade: Pancrustacea
- Class: Insecta
- Order: Coleoptera
- Suborder: Polyphaga
- Infraorder: Cucujiformia
- Family: Cerambycidae
- Genus: Nemophas
- Species: N. tricolor

Binomial name
- Nemophas tricolor Heller, 1896

= Nemophas tricolor =

Species of beetle

Nemophas tricolor is a species of beetle in the family Cerambycidae. It was described by Heller in 1896. It is known from Sulawesi, Indonesia.
