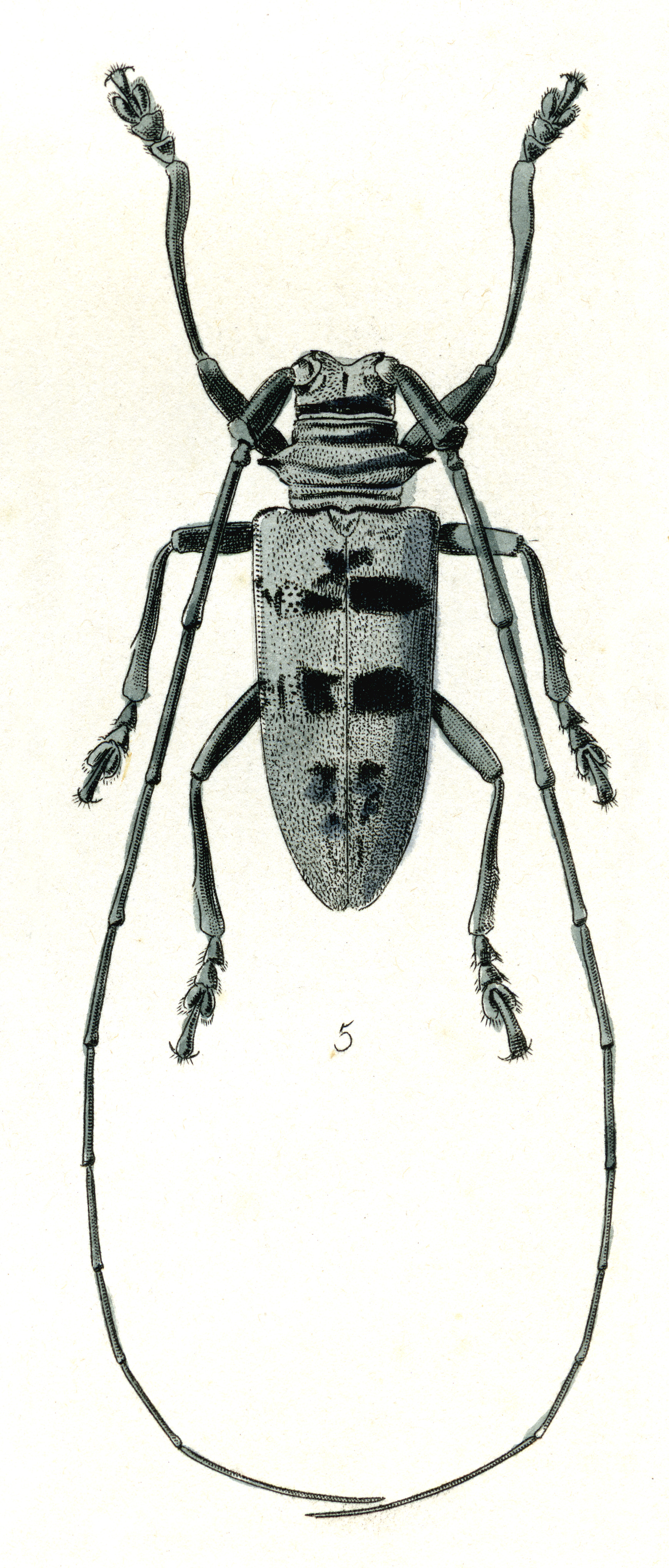
- Nemophas incensus

Scientific classification
- Kingdom: Animalia
- Phylum: Arthropoda
- Class: Insecta
- Order: Coleoptera
- Suborder: Polyphaga
- Infraorder: Cucujiformia
- Family: Cerambycidae
- Genus: Nemophas
- Species: N. incensus

Binomial name
- Nemophas incensus Pascoe, 1866

Synonyms
- Dolichoprosopus incensus (Pascoe, 1866)

= Nemophas incensus =

Species of beetle

Nemophas incensus is a species of beetle in the family Cerambycidae. It was described by Francis Polkinghorne Pascoe in 1866. It is known from Moluccas.
