= Omocyrius fulvisparsus =

Scientific classification
- Kingdom: Animalia
- Phylum: Arthropoda
- Class: Insecta
- Order: Coleoptera
- Suborder: Polyphaga
- Infraorder: Cucujiformia
- Family: Cerambycidae
- Genus: Omocyrius
- Species: O. fulvisparsus

Binomial name
- Omocyrius fulvisparsus Pascoe, 1866

Species of beetle

Omocyrius fulvisparsus is a species of beetle in the family Cerambycidae. It was described by Francis Polkinghorne Pascoe in 1866. It is known from Malaysia.
