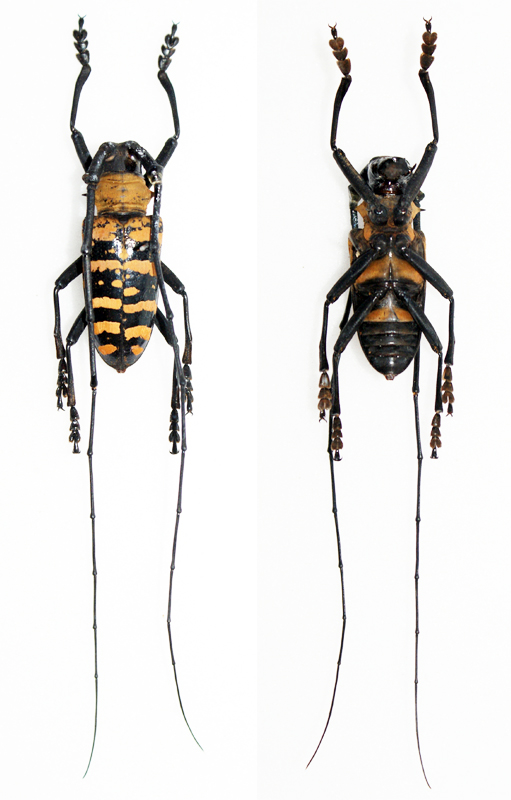

Scientific classification
- Kingdom: Animalia
- Phylum: Arthropoda
- Class: Insecta
- Order: Coleoptera
- Suborder: Polyphaga
- Infraorder: Cucujiformia
- Family: Cerambycidae
- Genus: Nemophas
- Species: N. forbesi

Binomial name
- Nemophas forbesi Waterhouse, 1884

= Nemophas forbesi =

Species of beetle

Nemophas forbesi is a species of beetle in the family Cerambycidae. It was described by Waterhouse in 1884. It is known from the Moluccas.
