= Nephelotus =

Scientific classification
- Domain: Eukaryota
- Kingdom: Animalia
- Phylum: Arthropoda
- Class: Insecta
- Order: Coleoptera
- Suborder: Polyphaga
- Infraorder: Cucujiformia
- Family: Cerambycidae
- Tribe: Lamiini
- Genus: Nephelotus

Genus of beetles

Nephelotus is a genus of longhorn beetles of the subfamily Lamiinae, containing the following species:

- Nephelotus alboplagiatus Breuning, 1938
- Nephelotus aurivillii Ritsema, 1914
- Nephelotus conspersus (J. Thomson, 1865)
- Nephelotus cristipennis Breuning, 1954
