= Nemophas zonatus =

Scientific classification
- Domain: Eukaryota
- Kingdom: Animalia
- Phylum: Arthropoda
- Class: Insecta
- Order: Coleoptera
- Suborder: Polyphaga
- Infraorder: Cucujiformia
- Family: Cerambycidae
- Tribe: Lamiini
- Genus: Nemophas
- Species: N. zonatus

Binomial name
- Nemophas zonatus Lansberge, 1880

Species of beetle

Nemophas zonatus is a species of beetle in the family Cerambycidae. It was described by Lansberge in 1880. It is known from Indonesia.
