= Pelargoderus alcanor =

Scientific classification
- Kingdom: Animalia
- Phylum: Arthropoda
- Clade: Pancrustacea
- Class: Insecta
- Order: Coleoptera
- Suborder: Polyphaga
- Infraorder: Cucujiformia
- Family: Cerambycidae
- Genus: Pelargoderus
- Species: P. alcanor

Binomial name
- Pelargoderus alcanor (Newman, 1842)

Synonyms
- Monohammus alcanor Newman, 1842

Species of beetle

Pelargoderus alcanor is a species of beetle in the family Cerambycidae. It is known from Newman in 1842, originally under the genus Monohammus. It is known from Sulawesi and the Philippines.

== Subspecies ==
- Pelargoderus alcanor alcanor (Newman, 1842)
- Pelargoderus alcanor thomsoni Aurivillius, 1921
