= Pelargoderus waigeuensis =

Scientific classification
- Kingdom: Animalia
- Phylum: Arthropoda
- Class: Insecta
- Order: Coleoptera
- Suborder: Polyphaga
- Infraorder: Cucujiformia
- Family: Cerambycidae
- Genus: Pelargoderus
- Species: P. waigeuensis

Binomial name
- Pelargoderus waigeuensis Gilmour, 1956

Species of beetle

Pelargoderus waigeuensis is a species of beetle in the family Cerambycidae. It was described by Gilmour in 1956. It is known from Moluccas.
