= Nemophas bennigseni =

Scientific classification
- Domain: Eukaryota
- Kingdom: Animalia
- Phylum: Arthropoda
- Class: Insecta
- Order: Coleoptera
- Suborder: Polyphaga
- Infraorder: Cucujiformia
- Family: Cerambycidae
- Tribe: Lamiini
- Genus: Nemophas
- Species: N. bennigseni

Binomial name
- Nemophas bennigseni Aurivillius, 1908

Synonyms
- Anoplophora bennigseni (Aurivillius, 1908) (misspelling); Nemophas benningseni Aurivillius, 1908 (misspelling)

Species of beetle

Nemophas bennigseni is a species of beetle in the family Cerambycidae. It was described by Per Olof Christopher Aurivillius in 1908. It is known from Papua New Guinea.
