= Pelargoderus vittatus =

Scientific classification
- Kingdom: Animalia
- Phylum: Arthropoda
- Class: Insecta
- Order: Coleoptera
- Suborder: Polyphaga
- Infraorder: Cucujiformia
- Family: Cerambycidae
- Genus: Pelargoderus
- Species: P. vittatus

Binomial name
- Pelargoderus vittatus Audinet-Serville, 1835

Species of beetle

Pelargoderus vittatus is a species of beetle in the family Cerambycidae. It was described by Audinet-Serville in 1835. It is known from Moluccas.
