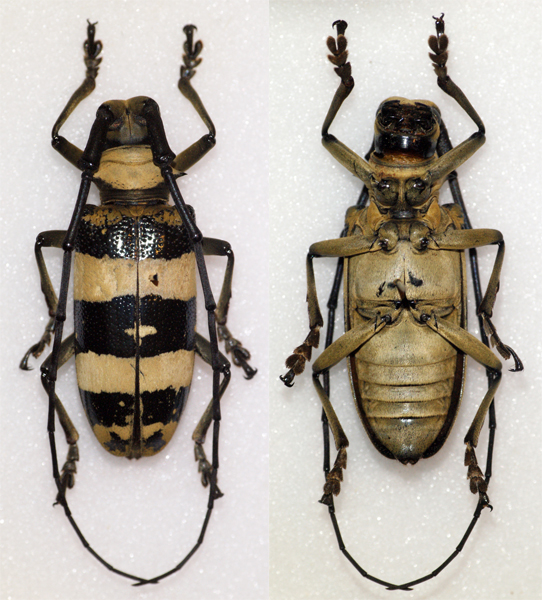
- Nemophas rosenbergi

Scientific classification
- Kingdom: Animalia
- Phylum: Arthropoda
- Clade: Pancrustacea
- Class: Insecta
- Order: Coleoptera
- Suborder: Polyphaga
- Infraorder: Cucujiformia
- Family: Cerambycidae
- Genus: Nemophas
- Species: N. rosenbergii

Binomial name
- Nemophas rosenbergii Ritsema, 1881

Synonyms
- Nemophas rosenbergi (Ritsema, 1881) (misspelling)

= Nemophas rosenbergii =

Species of beetle

Nemophas rosenbergii is a species of beetle in the family Cerambycidae. It was described by Coenraad Ritsema in 1881. It is known from Sulawesi.
