= Nemophas websteri =

Scientific classification
- Domain: Eukaryota
- Kingdom: Animalia
- Phylum: Arthropoda
- Class: Insecta
- Order: Coleoptera
- Suborder: Polyphaga
- Infraorder: Cucujiformia
- Family: Cerambycidae
- Tribe: Lamiini
- Genus: Nemophas
- Species: N. websteri

Binomial name
- Nemophas websteri Jordan, 1898

Species of beetle

Nemophas websteri is a species of beetle in the family Cerambycidae. It was described by Karl Jordan in 1898.
