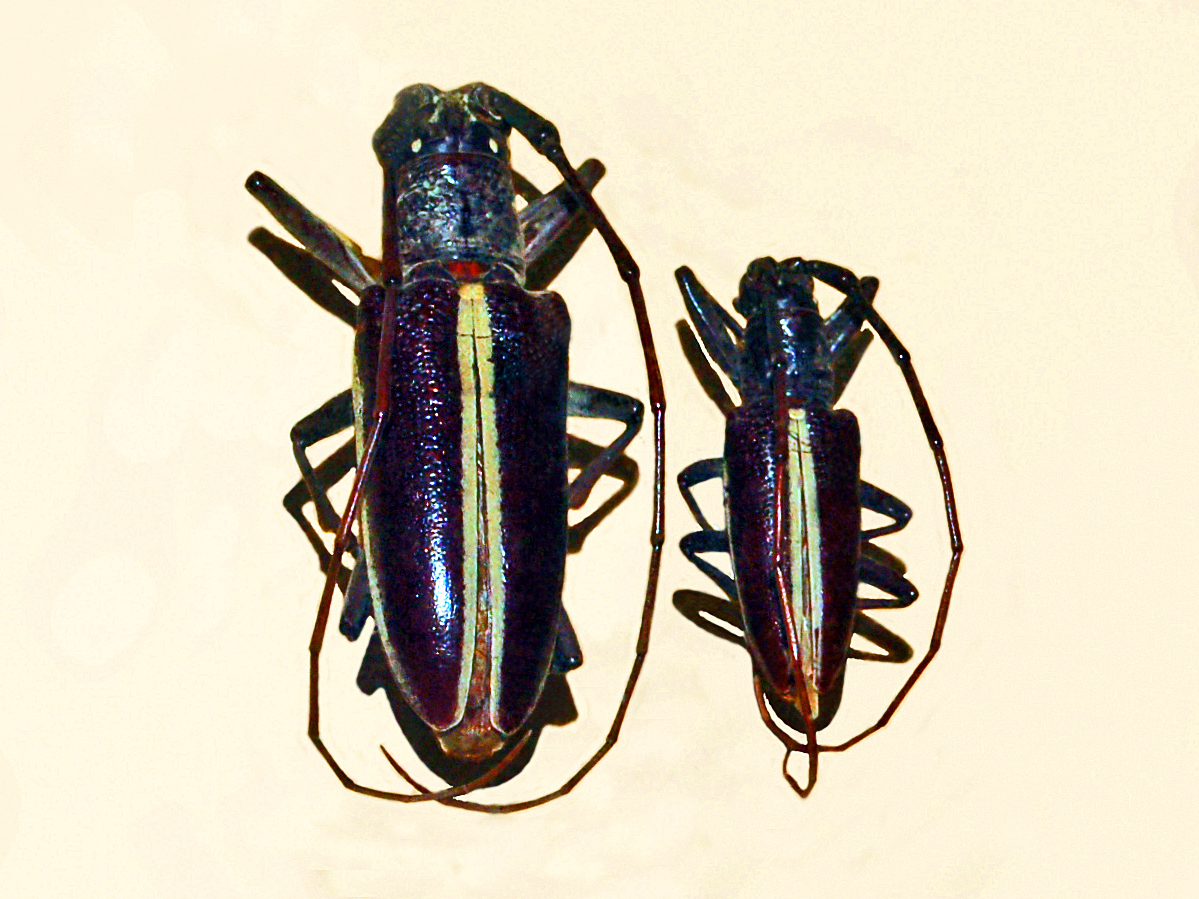
- Pelargoderus marginipennis from Enggano Island

Scientific classification
- Kingdom: Animalia
- Phylum: Arthropoda
- Class: Insecta
- Order: Coleoptera
- Suborder: Polyphaga
- Infraorder: Cucujiformia
- Family: Cerambycidae
- Subfamily: Lamiinae
- Tribe: Lamiini
- Genus: Pelargoderus; Audinet-Serville, 1835

Synonyms
- Nanyohammus Matsushita, 1935; Paragnoma Blanchard in d´Urville, 1853; Rhamses J. Thomson, 1857

= Pelargoderus =

Genus of beetles

Pelargoderus is a genus of beetle belonging to the family Cerambycidae.

== List of species ==
- Pelargoderus albopunctatus Breuning, 1980
- Pelargoderus alcanor (Newman, 1842)
- Pelargoderus arouensis (Thomson, 1857)
- Pelargoderus assimilis Aurivillius, 1908
- Pelargoderus basalis (Gahan, 1907)
- Pelargoderus bipunctatus (Dalman, 1815)
- Pelargoderus celebensis Breuning, 1966
- Pelargoderus cincticornis Ritsema, 1895
- Pelargoderus dibbhincksi Gilmour, 1947
- Pelargoderus djampeanus Breuning, 1960
- Pelargoderus flavicornis Gahan, 1888
- Pelargoderus fulvoirroratus Blanchard, 1885
- Pelargoderus luteosparsus (Matsushita, 1935)
- Pelargoderus luzonicus (Breuning, 1935)
- Pelargoderus malaccensis Breuning, 1935
- Pelargoderus marginipennis Ritsema, 1895
- Pelargoderus niger (Thomson, 1878)
- Pelargoderus papuanus Breuning, 1936
- Pelargoderus rubropunctatus (Guérin-Méneville, 1838)
- Pelargoderus salomonum Breuning, 1962
- Pelargoderus semitigrinus Ritsema, 1885
- Pelargoderus sijthoffii Ritsema, 1901
- Pelargoderus stellatus Vitali & Casadio, 2007
- Pelargoderus sumatranus Breuning, 1935
- Pelargoderus trigonalis Heyden, 1897
- Pelargoderus vittatus Audinet-Serville, 1835
- Pelargoderus vitticollis Gressitt, 1952
- Pelargoderus waigeuensis Gilmour, 1956
