= Tetraglenes fusiformis =

Scientific classification
- Domain: Eukaryota
- Kingdom: Animalia
- Phylum: Arthropoda
- Class: Insecta
- Order: Coleoptera
- Suborder: Polyphaga
- Infraorder: Cucujiformia
- Family: Cerambycidae
- Genus: Tetraglenes
- Species: T. fusiformis

Binomial name
- Tetraglenes fusiformis Pascoe, 1866

Species of beetle

Tetraglenes fusiformis is a species of beetle in the family Cerambycidae. It was described by Pascoe in 1866.
