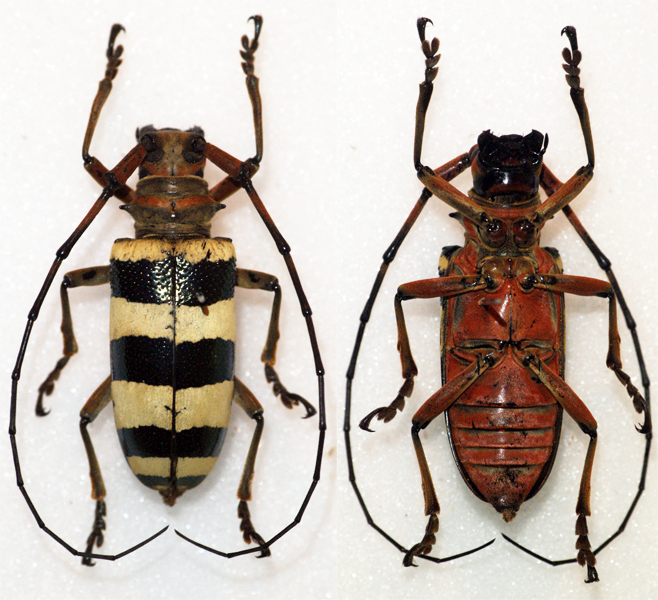

Scientific classification
- Domain: Eukaryota
- Kingdom: Animalia
- Phylum: Arthropoda
- Class: Insecta
- Order: Coleoptera
- Suborder: Polyphaga
- Infraorder: Cucujiformia
- Family: Cerambycidae
- Tribe: Lamiini
- Genus: Nemophas
- Species: N. subterrubens

Binomial name
- Nemophas subterrubens Heller, 1924

Synonyms
- Nemophas subterrubus Heller, 1924 (misspelling)

= Nemophas subterrubens =

Species of beetle

Nemophas subterrubens is a species of beetle in the family Cerambycidae. It was described by Heller in 1924. It is known from the Philippines.
