= Tetraglenes insignis =

Scientific classification
- Domain: Eukaryota
- Kingdom: Animalia
- Phylum: Arthropoda
- Class: Insecta
- Order: Coleoptera
- Suborder: Polyphaga
- Infraorder: Cucujiformia
- Family: Cerambycidae
- Genus: Tetraglenes
- Species: T. insignis

Binomial name
- Tetraglenes insignis Newman, 1842

Species of beetle

Tetraglenes insignis is a species of beetle in the family Cerambycidae. It was described by Newman in 1842.
