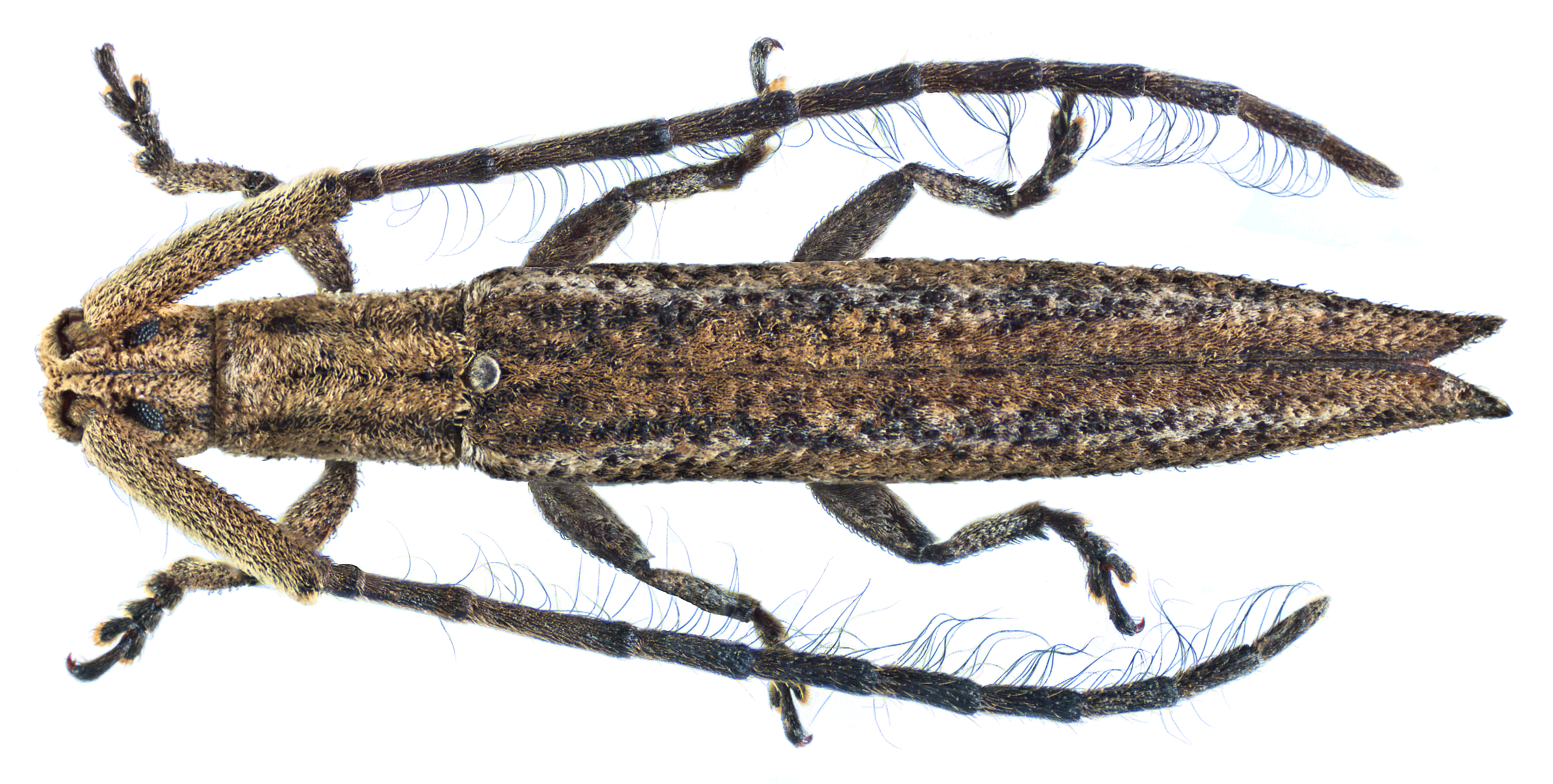
- Tetraglenes hirticornis

Scientific classification
- Kingdom: Animalia
- Phylum: Arthropoda
- Clade: Pancrustacea
- Class: Insecta
- Order: Coleoptera
- Suborder: Polyphaga
- Infraorder: Cucujiformia
- Family: Cerambycidae
- Genus: Tetraglenes
- Species: T. hirticornis

Binomial name
- Tetraglenes hirticornis (Fabricius, 1798)

= Tetraglenes hirticornis =

Species of beetle

Tetraglenes hirticornis is a species of beetle in the family Cerambycidae. It was described by Johan Christian Fabricius in 1798.
