= Tetraglenes =

Scientific classification
- Domain: Eukaryota
- Kingdom: Animalia
- Phylum: Arthropoda
- Class: Insecta
- Order: Coleoptera
- Suborder: Polyphaga
- Infraorder: Cucujiformia
- Family: Cerambycidae
- Tribe: Agapanthiini
- Genus: Tetraglenes

Genus of beetles

Tetraglenes is a genus of beetles in the family Cerambycidae, containing the following species:

- Tetraglenes annamensis Breuning, 1943
- Tetraglenes bacillarius Lameere, 1893
- Tetraglenes breviceps Kolbe, 1894
- Tetraglenes bucculenta Gahan, 1895
- Tetraglenes carinithorax Breuning, 1942
- Tetraglenes ceylonensis Breuning, 1942
- Tetraglenes crassicornis Hintz, 1919
- Tetraglenes diuroides Ritsema, 1885
- Tetraglenes flavovittata Breuning, 1948
- Tetraglenes fusiformis Pascoe, 1866
- Tetraglenes grossepunctata Breuning, 1942
- Tetraglenes hirticornis (Fabricius, 1798)
- Tetraglenes insignis Newman, 1842
- Tetraglenes intermedia Breuning, 1954
- Tetraglenes nimbae Lepesme, 1952
- Tetraglenes phantoma Gerstaecker, 1871
- Tetraglenes rufescens Pic, 1927
- Tetraglenes setosa Breuning, 1942
- Tetraglenes somaliensis Breuning, 1952
