= Nemophas sumbaensis =

Scientific classification
- Domain: Eukaryota
- Kingdom: Animalia
- Phylum: Arthropoda
- Class: Insecta
- Order: Coleoptera
- Suborder: Polyphaga
- Infraorder: Cucujiformia
- Family: Cerambycidae
- Tribe: Lamiini
- Genus: Nemophas
- Species: N. sumbaensis

Binomial name
- Nemophas sumbaensis Vitali, 2013

Species of beetle

Nemophas sumbaensis is a species of beetle in the family Cerambycidae. It was described by Vitali in 2013. It is known from Indonesia.
