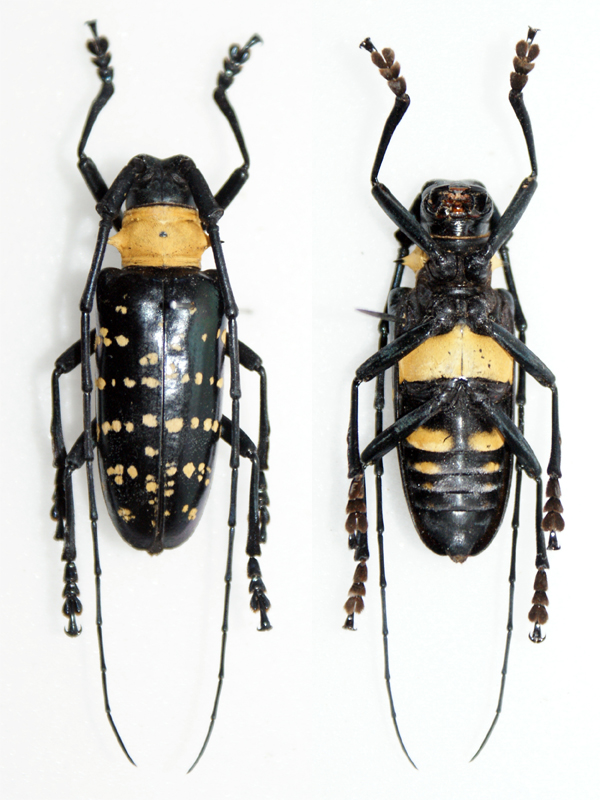

Scientific classification
- Kingdom: Animalia
- Phylum: Arthropoda
- Class: Insecta
- Order: Coleoptera
- Suborder: Polyphaga
- Infraorder: Cucujiformia
- Family: Cerambycidae
- Genus: Nemophas
- Species: N. helleri

Binomial name
- Nemophas helleri Hauser, 1904

= Nemophas helleri =

Species of beetle

Nemophas helleri is a species of beetle in the family Cerambycidae. It was described by Hauser in 1904. It is known from Moluccas.
