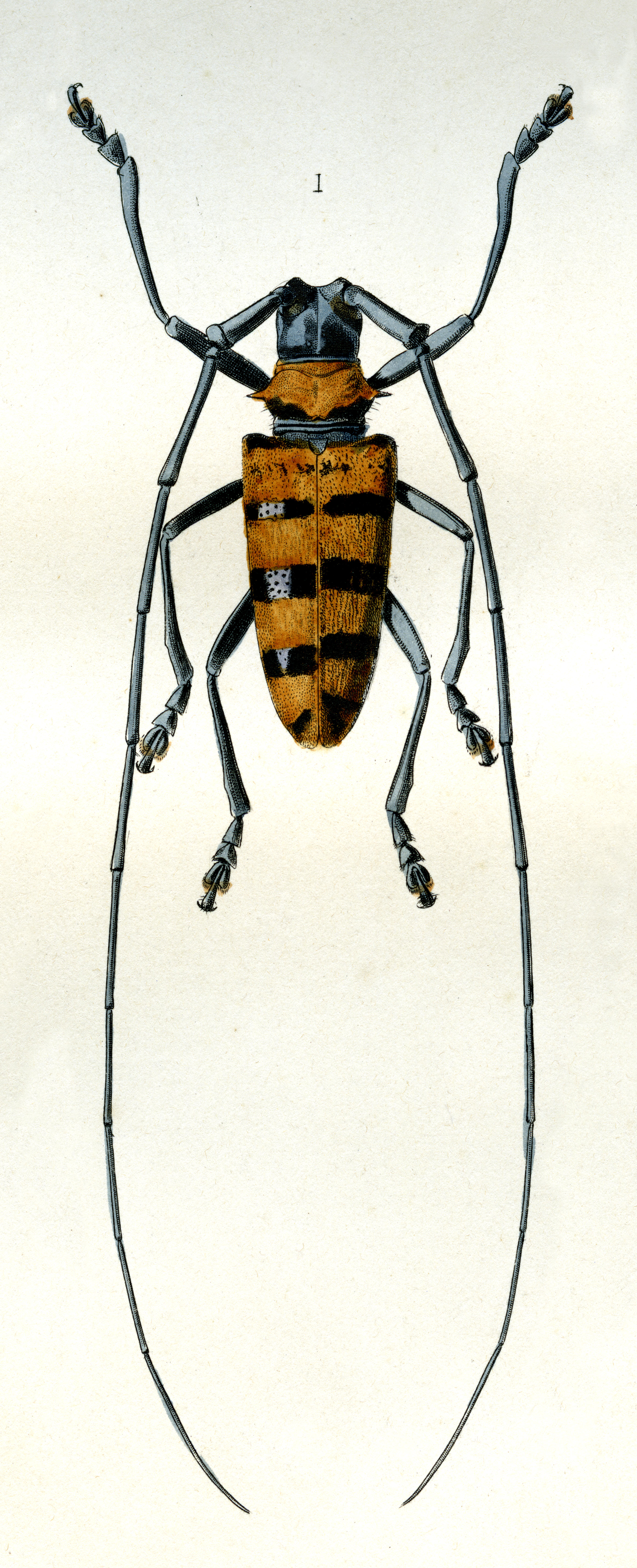
- Nemophas grayii

Scientific classification
- Domain: Eukaryota
- Kingdom: Animalia
- Phylum: Arthropoda
- Class: Insecta
- Order: Coleoptera
- Suborder: Polyphaga
- Infraorder: Cucujiformia
- Family: Cerambycidae
- Tribe: Lamiini
- Genus: Nemophas

= Nemophas =

Genus of beetles

Nemophas is a genus of longhorn beetles of the subfamily Lamiinae, containing the following species:

- Nemophas ammiralis Schwarzer, 1931
- Nemophas batoceroides Thomson, 1864
- Nemophas bennigseni Aurivillius, 1908
- Nemophas bicinctus Lansberge, 1880
- Nemophas cyanescens Jordan, 1898
- Nemophas forbesi Waterhouse, 1884
- Nemophas grayii (Pascoe, 1859)
- Nemophas helleri Hauser, 1904
- Nemophas incensus Pascoe, 1866
- Nemophas leuciscus Pascoe, 1866
- Nemophas nigriceps Vitali, 2013
- Nemophas ramosi Schultze, 1920
- Nemophas rosenbergii Ritsema, 1881
- Nemophas subterrubens Heller, 1924
- Nemophas sumbaensis Vitali, 2013
- Nemophas tomentosus (Buquet, 1859)
- Nemophas tricolor Heller, 1896
- Nemophas trifasciatus Heller, 1919
- Nemophas websteri Jordan, 1898
- Nemophas zonatus Lansberge, 1880
