= Pelargoderus trigonalis =

Scientific classification
- Kingdom: Animalia
- Phylum: Arthropoda
- Class: Insecta
- Order: Coleoptera
- Suborder: Polyphaga
- Infraorder: Cucujiformia
- Family: Cerambycidae
- Genus: Pelargoderus
- Species: P. trigonalis

Binomial name
- Pelargoderus trigonalis Heyden, 1897

Synonyms
- Pelargoderus nigroplagiatus Ritsema, 1898

Species of beetle

Pelargoderus trigonalis is a species of beetle in the family Cerambycidae. It is known from Heyden in 1897.
