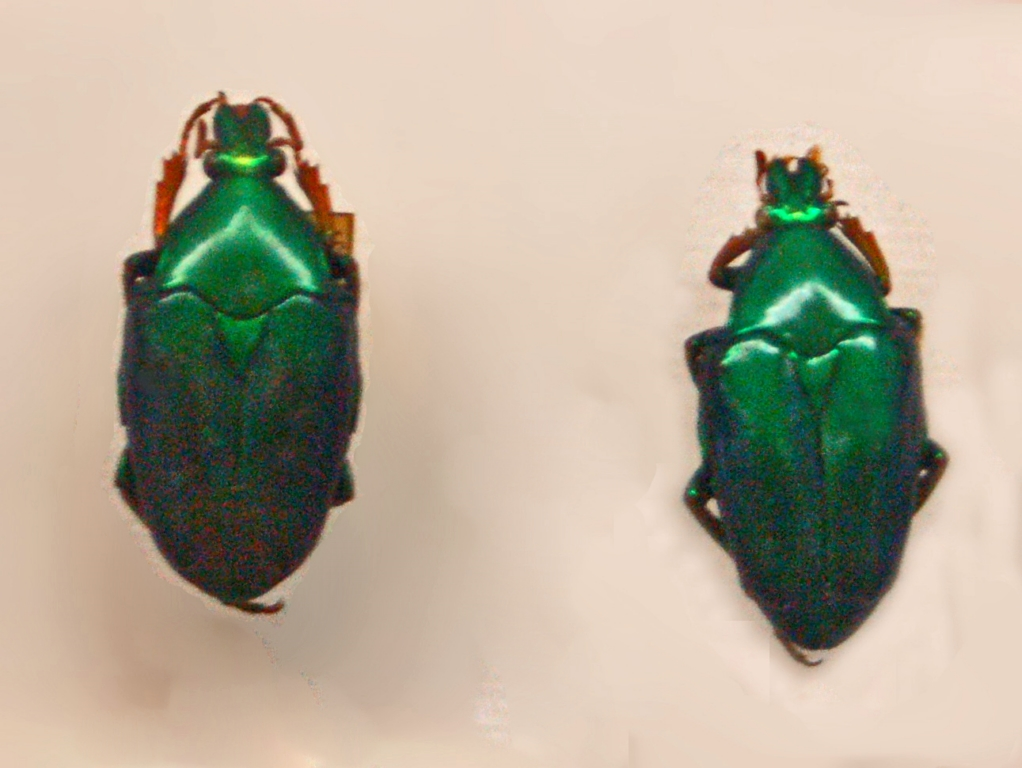
- Pseudochalcothea auripes at National Museum (Prague)

Scientific classification
- Kingdom: Animalia
- Phylum: Arthropoda
- Clade: Pancrustacea
- Class: Insecta
- Order: Coleoptera
- Suborder: Polyphaga
- Infraorder: Scarabaeiformia
- Family: Scarabaeidae
- Subfamily: Cetoniinae
- Genus: Pseudochalcothea; Ritsema, 1882

= Pseudochalcothea =

Genus of beetles

Pseudochalcothea is a genus of beetles of the family Scarabaeidae, subfamily Cetoniinae and tribe Taenioderini.

== List of Species ==
There are 15 species in this Genus:

- Pseudochalcothea auripes
- Pseudochalcothea compacta
- Pseudochalcothea kalimantanica
- Pseudochalcothea macrophylla
- Pseudochalcothea nagaii
- Pseudochalcothea nishikawai
- Pseudochalcothea planiuscula
- Pseudochalcothea pomacea
- Pseudochalcothea ritsemae
- Pseudochalcothea sakaii
- Pseudochalcothea shelfordi
- Pseudochalcothea spathulifera
- Pseudochalcothea staudingeri
- Pseudochalcothea virens
- Pseudochalcothea viridipes
