= Nephelotus cristipennis =

Scientific classification
- Kingdom: Animalia
- Phylum: Arthropoda
- Class: Insecta
- Order: Coleoptera
- Suborder: Polyphaga
- Infraorder: Cucujiformia
- Family: Cerambycidae
- Genus: Nephelotus
- Species: N. cristipennis

Binomial name
- Nephelotus cristipennis Breuning, 1954

Species of beetle

Nephelotus cristipennis is a species of beetle in the family Cerambycidae. It was described by Stephan von Breuning in 1954. It is known from Sumatra.
