= Tetraglenes flavovittata =

Scientific classification
- Kingdom: Animalia
- Phylum: Arthropoda
- Class: Insecta
- Order: Coleoptera
- Suborder: Polyphaga
- Infraorder: Cucujiformia
- Family: Cerambycidae
- Genus: Tetraglenes
- Species: T. flavovittata

Binomial name
- Tetraglenes flavovittata Breuning, 1948

Synonyms
- Tetraglenes flavovittatus Breuning, 1948 (Missp.)

Species of beetle

Tetraglenes flavovittata is a species of beetle in the family Cerambycidae. It was described by Breuning in 1948.
