= Pelargoderus stellatus =

Scientific classification
- Kingdom: Animalia
- Phylum: Arthropoda
- Class: Insecta
- Order: Coleoptera
- Suborder: Polyphaga
- Infraorder: Cucujiformia
- Family: Cerambycidae
- Genus: Pelargoderus
- Species: P. stellatus

Binomial name
- Pelargoderus stellatus Vitali & Casadio, 2007

Species of beetle

Pelargoderus stellatus is a species of beetle in the family Cerambycidae. It was described by Vitali and Casadio in 2007. It is known from the Solomon Islands.
