= Thermonotus cylindricus =

Scientific classification
- Kingdom: Animalia
- Phylum: Arthropoda
- Class: Insecta
- Order: Coleoptera
- Suborder: Polyphaga
- Infraorder: Cucujiformia
- Family: Cerambycidae
- Genus: Thermonotus
- Species: T. cylindricus

Binomial name
- Thermonotus cylindricus Aurivillius, 1911

Species of beetle

Thermonotus cylindricus is a species of beetle in the family Cerambycidae. It was described by Per Olof Christopher Aurivillius in 1911. It is known from Malaysia and Borneo.
