= Tetraglenes bucculenta =

Scientific classification
- Domain: Eukaryota
- Kingdom: Animalia
- Phylum: Arthropoda
- Class: Insecta
- Order: Coleoptera
- Suborder: Polyphaga
- Infraorder: Cucujiformia
- Family: Cerambycidae
- Genus: Tetraglenes
- Species: T. bucculenta

Binomial name
- Tetraglenes bucculenta Gahan, 1895

Species of beetle

Tetraglenes bucculenta is a species of beetle in the family Cerambycidae. It was described by Gahan in 1895.
