= Pelargoderus vitticollis =

Scientific classification
- Kingdom: Animalia
- Phylum: Arthropoda
- Class: Insecta
- Order: Coleoptera
- Suborder: Polyphaga
- Infraorder: Cucujiformia
- Family: Cerambycidae
- Genus: Pelargoderus
- Species: P. vitticollis

Binomial name
- Pelargoderus vitticollis Gressitt, 1952

Species of beetle

Pelargoderus vitticollis is a species of beetle in the family Cerambycidae. It was described by Gressitt in 1952. It is known from the Solomon Islands.
