= Pelargoderus bipunctatus =

Scientific classification
- Kingdom: Animalia
- Phylum: Arthropoda
- Clade: Pancrustacea
- Class: Insecta
- Order: Coleoptera
- Suborder: Polyphaga
- Infraorder: Cucujiformia
- Family: Cerambycidae
- Genus: Pelargoderus
- Species: P. bipunctatus

Binomial name
- Pelargoderus bipunctatus (Dalman, 1815)

Synonyms
- Lamia bipunctata Dalman, 1815

Species of beetle

Pelargoderus bipunctatus is a species of beetle in the family Cerambycidae. It was described by Dalman in 1815. It is known from Java.
