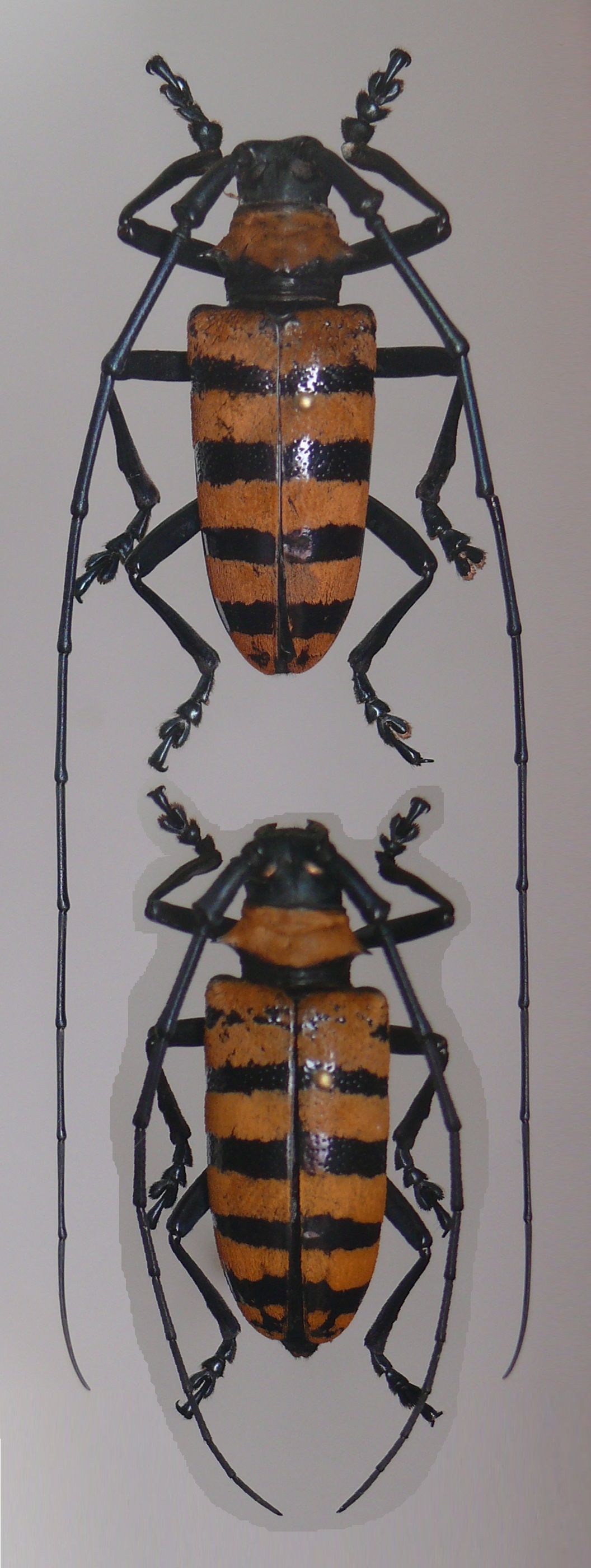
- Male and female in Indonesia

Scientific classification
- Kingdom: Animalia
- Phylum: Arthropoda
- Class: Insecta
- Order: Coleoptera
- Suborder: Polyphaga
- Infraorder: Cucujiformia
- Family: Cerambycidae
- Genus: Nemophas
- Species: N. grayii

Binomial name
- Nemophas grayii (Pascoe, 1859)

Synonyms
- Monochamus doleschali Redtenbacher, 1868; Monohammus grayii Pascoe, 1859; Nemophas grayi m. quinquefasciatus Breuning, 1943; Nemophas grayi Pascoe, 1859 (misspelling)

= Nemophas grayii =

Species of beetle

Nemophas grayii is a species of beetle in the family Cerambycidae. It was described by Francis Polkinghorne Pascoe in 1859, originally under the genus Monohammus. It is known from Moluccas.
