= Thermonotus nigriventris =

Scientific classification
- Kingdom: Animalia
- Phylum: Arthropoda
- Class: Insecta
- Order: Coleoptera
- Suborder: Polyphaga
- Infraorder: Cucujiformia
- Family: Cerambycidae
- Genus: Thermonotus
- Species: T. nigriventris

Binomial name
- Thermonotus nigriventris Breuning, 1959

Species of beetle

Thermonotus nigriventris is a species of beetle in the family Cerambycidae. It was described by Stephan von Breuning in 1959. It is known from Myanmar.
