= Nemophas nigriceps =

Scientific classification
- Kingdom: Animalia
- Phylum: Arthropoda
- Clade: Pancrustacea
- Class: Insecta
- Order: Coleoptera
- Suborder: Polyphaga
- Infraorder: Cucujiformia
- Family: Cerambycidae
- Genus: Nemophas
- Species: N. nigriceps

Binomial name
- Nemophas nigriceps Vitali, 2013

Species of beetle

Nemophas nigriceps is a species of beetle in the family Cerambycidae. It was described by Vitali in 2013. It is known from Sulawesi.
