= Thermonotus ruber =

Scientific classification
- Kingdom: Animalia
- Phylum: Arthropoda
- Clade: Pancrustacea
- Class: Insecta
- Order: Coleoptera
- Suborder: Polyphaga
- Infraorder: Cucujiformia
- Family: Cerambycidae
- Genus: Thermonotus
- Species: T. ruber

Binomial name
- Thermonotus ruber (Pic, 1923)

Synonyms
- Gibbanamera rubra Pic, 1923

Species of beetle

Thermonotus ruber is a species of beetle in the family Cerambycidae. It was described by Maurice Pic in 1923, originally as the type species of the genus Gibbanamera. It is known from China and Vietnam. It feeds on Lindera communis.
