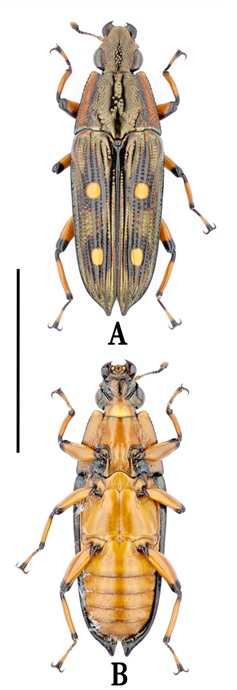
- Helota feai

Scientific classification
- Kingdom: Animalia
- Phylum: Arthropoda
- Clade: Pancrustacea
- Class: Insecta
- Order: Coleoptera
- Suborder: Polyphaga
- Infraorder: Cucujiformia
- Family: Helotidae
- Genus: Helota; MacLeay, 1825

Diversity
- 23 species

= Helota =

Genus of beetles

Helota is a genus of beetles in the family Helotidae

== Species ==
Helota contains the following species:

- Helota acutipennis Ritsema, 1914 - China
- Helota brancuccii Lee, 2008 - Laos, Thailand
- Helota fairmairei Ritsema, 1889 - Nepal, India, Bhutan, Myanmar
- Helota feai Ritsema, 1891 - Myanmar, Laos, Thailand
- Helota fulviventris Kolbe, 1886 - China, Japan, Korea, USSR
- Helota gemmata Gorham, 1874 - Japan, Korea
- Helota gorhami Olliff, 1883 - China, South Korea
- Helota jentinkii Ritsema, 1906 - Indonesia (Sumatra)
- Helota kolbei Ritsema, 1889 - China
- Helota lesnei Ritsema, 1906 - China
- Helota longipes Ritsema, 1889 - India, Bhutan, Myanmar
- Helota mellii Westood, 1848 - [unknown]
- Helota ohbayashii Lee, 2007 - Thailand, Laos
- Helota rouyeri Ritsema, 1906 - Indonesia (Sumatra)
- Helota schuhi Lee, 2007 - China
- Helota scintillans Olliff, 1884 - Indonesia (Java)
- Helota servillei Hope, 1840 - India, Nepal, Bhutan, China
- Helota sinensis Olliff, 1883 - China, Vietnam
- Helota thibetana Westwood, 1842 - China, Nepal, Laos, Myanmar, Bhutan, Vietnam, West Malaysia
- Helota thoracica Ritsema, 1895 - China, Vietnam, Laos, Thailand, Taiwan
- Helota vandepolli Ritsema, 1891 - China, India, Laos, Vietnam, Malaysia, Indonesia (see also Helota lugubris)
- Helota ventralis Ritsema, 1891 - Myanmar, Laos, Thailand, Vietnam
- Helota vigorsii MacLeay, 1825 - West Malaysia, Thailand, Indonesia (Sumatra, Java, Borneo)
