= Pelargoderus luzonicus =

Scientific classification
- Kingdom: Animalia
- Phylum: Arthropoda
- Class: Insecta
- Order: Coleoptera
- Suborder: Polyphaga
- Infraorder: Cucujiformia
- Family: Cerambycidae
- Genus: Pelargoderus
- Species: P. luzonicus

Binomial name
- Pelargoderus luzonicus (Breuning, 1935)

Synonyms
- Epepeotes luzonicus Breuning, 1935

Species of beetle

Pelargoderus luzonicus is a species of beetle in the family Cerambycidae. It was described by Stephan von Breuning in 1935, originally under the genus Epepeotes.
