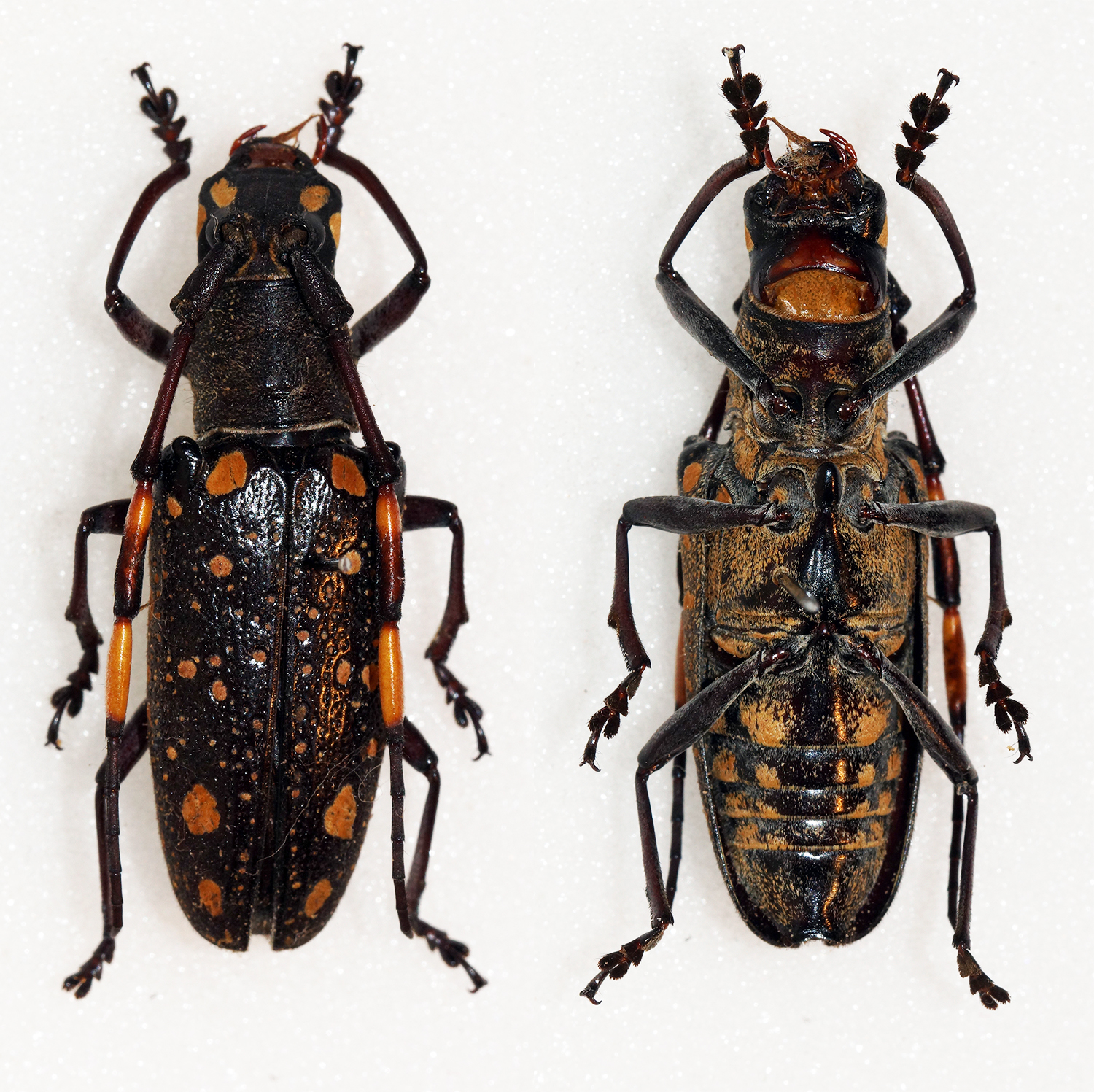
- Omocyrius jansoni

Scientific classification
- Kingdom: Animalia
- Phylum: Arthropoda
- Class: Insecta
- Order: Coleoptera
- Suborder: Polyphaga
- Infraorder: Cucujiformia
- Family: Cerambycidae
- Tribe: Lamiini
- Genus: Omocyrius

= Omocyrius =

Genus of beetles

Omocyrius is a genus of longhorn beetles of the subfamily Lamiinae, containing the following species:

- Omocyrius fulvisparsus Pascoe, 1866
- Omocyrius jansoni Ritsema, 1888
