= Pelargoderus niger =

Scientific classification
- Kingdom: Animalia
- Phylum: Arthropoda
- Class: Insecta
- Order: Coleoptera
- Suborder: Polyphaga
- Infraorder: Cucujiformia
- Family: Cerambycidae
- Genus: Pelargoderus
- Species: P. niger

Binomial name
- Pelargoderus niger (Thomson, 1878)

Synonyms
- Paragnoma nigra Thomson, 1878

Species of beetle

Pelargoderus niger is a species of beetle in the family Cerambycidae. It was described by James Thomson in 1878, originally under the genus Paragnoma.
