= Nemophas tomentosus =

Scientific classification
- Domain: Eukaryota
- Kingdom: Animalia
- Phylum: Arthropoda
- Class: Insecta
- Order: Coleoptera
- Suborder: Polyphaga
- Infraorder: Cucujiformia
- Family: Cerambycidae
- Tribe: Lamiini
- Genus: Nemophas
- Species: N. tomentosus

Binomial name
- Nemophas tomentosus (Buquet, 1859)

Synonyms
- Apriona humeralis Kaup, 1866; Apriona? tomentosa Buquet, 1850; Iothocera tomentosa (Buquet, 1859); Jothocera tomentosa (Buquet, 1864)

Species of beetle

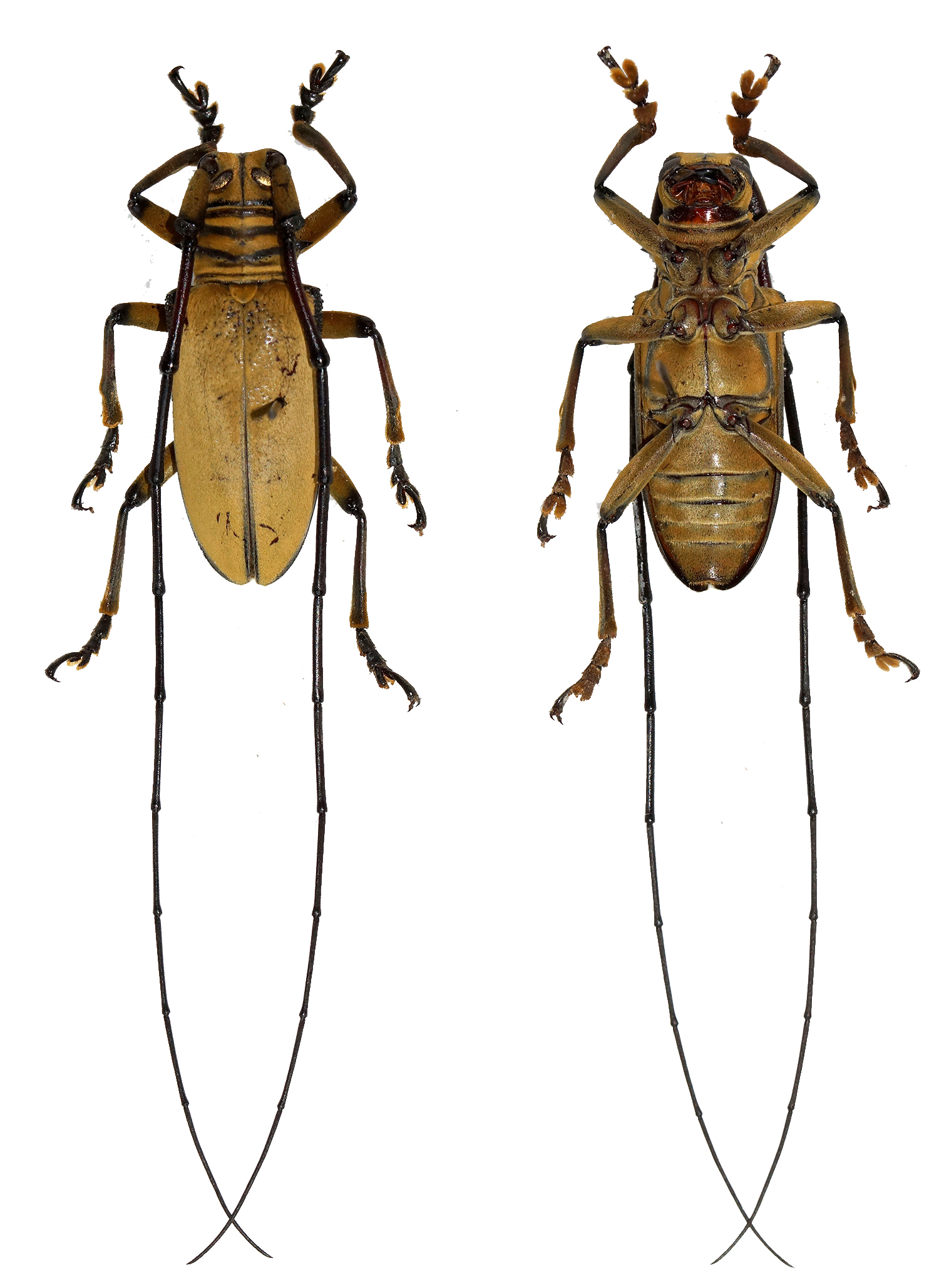

Nemophas tomentosus is a species of beetle in the family Cerambycidae. It was described by Buquet in 1859, originally under the genus Apriona. It is known from the Solomon Islands and Papua New Guinea.
