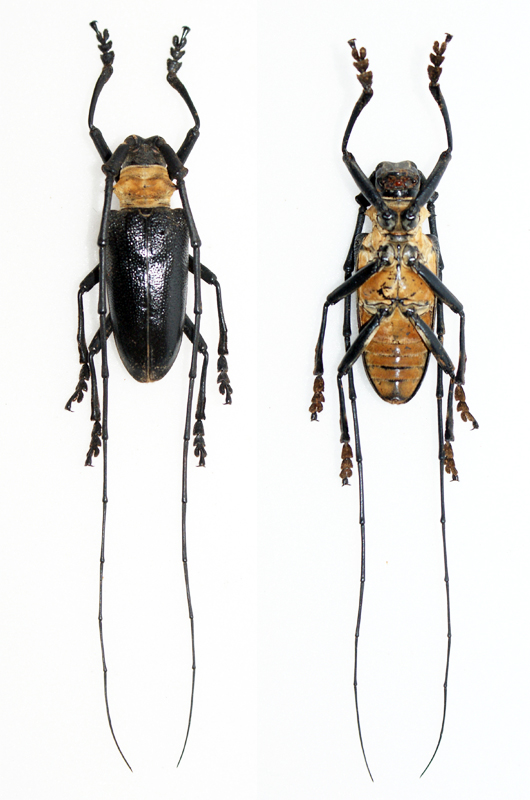

Scientific classification
- Domain: Eukaryota
- Kingdom: Animalia
- Phylum: Arthropoda
- Class: Insecta
- Order: Coleoptera
- Suborder: Polyphaga
- Infraorder: Cucujiformia
- Family: Cerambycidae
- Tribe: Lamiini
- Genus: Nemophas
- Species: N. batoceroides

Binomial name
- Nemophas batoceroides Thomson, 1864

= Nemophas batoceroides =

Species of beetle

Nemophas batoceroides is a species of beetle in the family Cerambycidae. It was described by James Thomson in 1864. It is known from Indonesia.
