= Thermonotus nigripes =

Scientific classification
- Kingdom: Animalia
- Phylum: Arthropoda
- Class: Insecta
- Order: Coleoptera
- Suborder: Polyphaga
- Infraorder: Cucujiformia
- Family: Cerambycidae
- Genus: Thermonotus
- Species: T. nigripes

Binomial name
- Thermonotus nigripes Gahan, 1888

Species of beetle

Thermonotus nigripes is a species of beetle in the family Cerambycidae. It was described by Charles Joseph Gahan in 1888. It is known from Indonesia, Laos, India, China, and Malaysia.
