= Pelargoderus dibbhincksi =

Scientific classification
- Kingdom: Animalia
- Phylum: Arthropoda
- Class: Insecta
- Order: Coleoptera
- Suborder: Polyphaga
- Infraorder: Cucujiformia
- Family: Cerambycidae
- Genus: Pelargoderus
- Species: P. dibbhincksi

Binomial name
- Pelargoderus dibbhincksi Gilmour, 1947

Synonyms
- Pelargoderus sanghiricus Breuning, 1948

Species of beetle

Pelargoderus dibbhincksi is a species of beetle in the family Cerambycidae. It was described by Gilmour in 1947.
