= Tetraglenes intermedia =

Scientific classification
- Kingdom: Animalia
- Phylum: Arthropoda
- Clade: Pancrustacea
- Class: Insecta
- Order: Coleoptera
- Suborder: Polyphaga
- Infraorder: Cucujiformia
- Family: Cerambycidae
- Genus: Tetraglenes
- Species: T. intermedia

Binomial name
- Tetraglenes intermedia Breuning, 1954

Species of beetle

Tetraglenes intermedia is a species of beetle in the family Cerambycidae. It was described by Breuning in 1954. The Tetraglenes is holometabolous (development of insects with complete metamorphosis which involves a pupal stage).
