= Tetraglenes phantoma =

Scientific classification
- Domain: Eukaryota
- Kingdom: Animalia
- Phylum: Arthropoda
- Class: Insecta
- Order: Coleoptera
- Suborder: Polyphaga
- Infraorder: Cucujiformia
- Family: Cerambycidae
- Genus: Tetraglenes
- Species: T. phantoma

Binomial name
- Tetraglenes phantoma Gerstaecker, 1871

Species of beetle

Tetraglenes phantoma is a species of beetle in the family Cerambycidae. It was described by Carl Eduard Adolph Gerstaecker in 1871.
