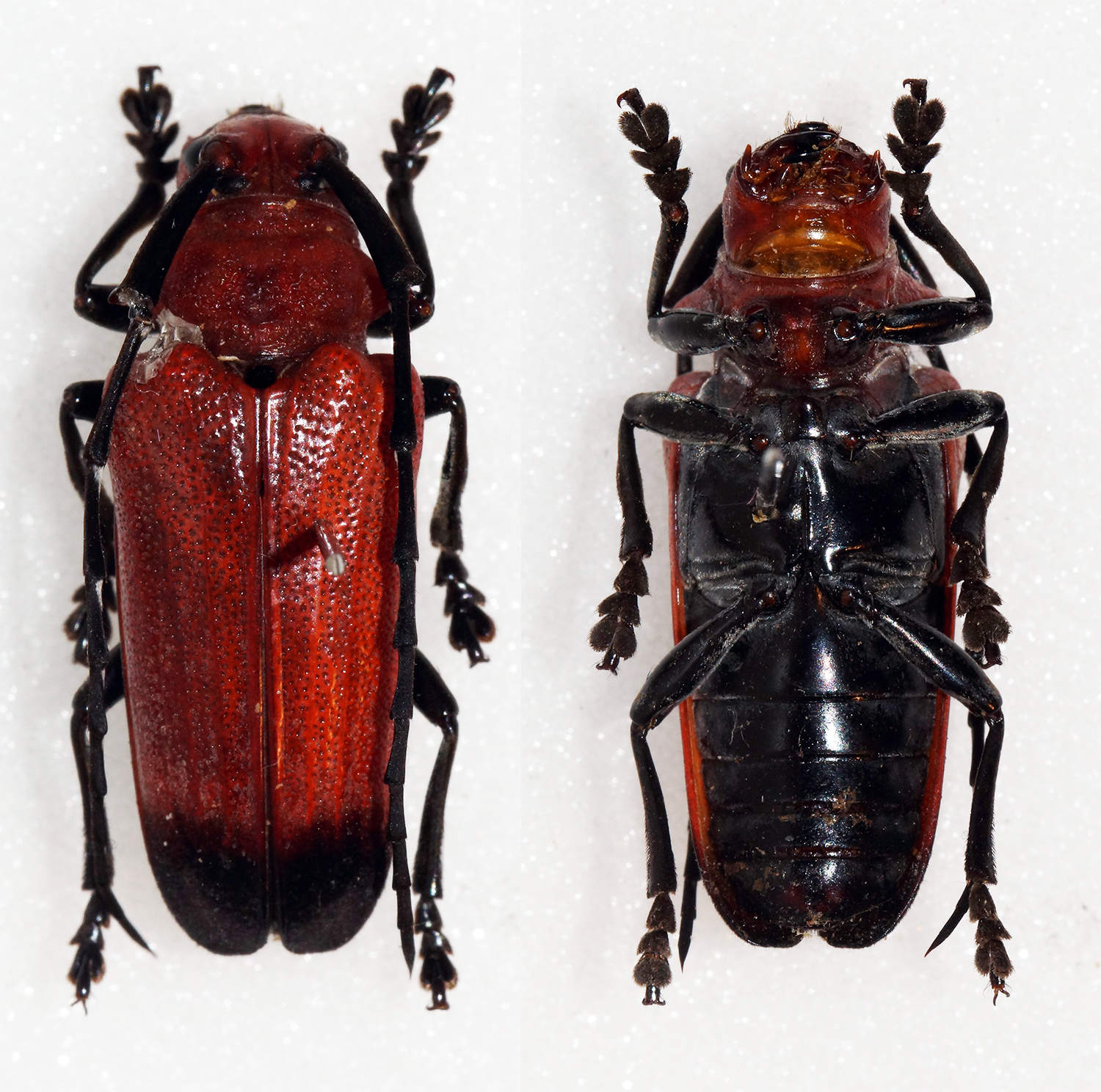
- Thermonotus pasteuri

Scientific classification
- Kingdom: Animalia
- Phylum: Arthropoda
- Class: Insecta
- Order: Coleoptera
- Suborder: Polyphaga
- Infraorder: Cucujiformia
- Family: Cerambycidae
- Tribe: Lamiini
- Genus: Thermonotus; Gahan, 1888

= Thermonotus =

Genus of beetles

Thermonotus is a genus of longhorn beetles of the subfamily Lamiinae, containing the following species:

- Thermonotus apicalis Ritsema, 1881
- Thermonotus cylindricus Aurivillius, 1911
- Thermonotus nigripennis Ritsema, 1896
- Thermonotus nigripes Gahan, 1888
- Thermonotus nigriventris Breuning, 1959
- Thermonotus pasteuri Ritsema, 1890
- Thermonotus ruber (Pic, 1923)
- Thermonotus rufipes Breuning, 1958
