= Pelargoderus basalis =

Scientific classification
- Kingdom: Animalia
- Phylum: Arthropoda
- Class: Insecta
- Order: Coleoptera
- Suborder: Polyphaga
- Infraorder: Cucujiformia
- Family: Cerambycidae
- Genus: Pelargoderus
- Species: P. basalis

Binomial name
- Pelargoderus basalis (Gahan, 1907)

Synonyms
- Epepeotes basalis Gahan, 1907

Species of beetle

Pelargoderus basalis is a species of beetle in the family Cerambycidae. It was described by Charles Joseph Gahan in 1907, originally under the genus Epepeotes.
