= Pelargoderus arouensis =

Scientific classification
- Kingdom: Animalia
- Phylum: Arthropoda
- Class: Insecta
- Order: Coleoptera
- Suborder: Polyphaga
- Infraorder: Cucujiformia
- Family: Cerambycidae
- Genus: Pelargoderus
- Species: P. arouensis

Binomial name
- Pelargoderus arouensis (Thomson, 1857)

Synonyms
- Pelargoderus rugosus Waterhouse, 1884; Rhamses arouensis Thomson, 1857

Species of beetle

Pelargoderus arouensis is a species of beetle in the family Cerambycidae. It was described by James Thomson in 1857, originally under the genus Rhamses. It is known from Papua New Guinea and Moluccas.
