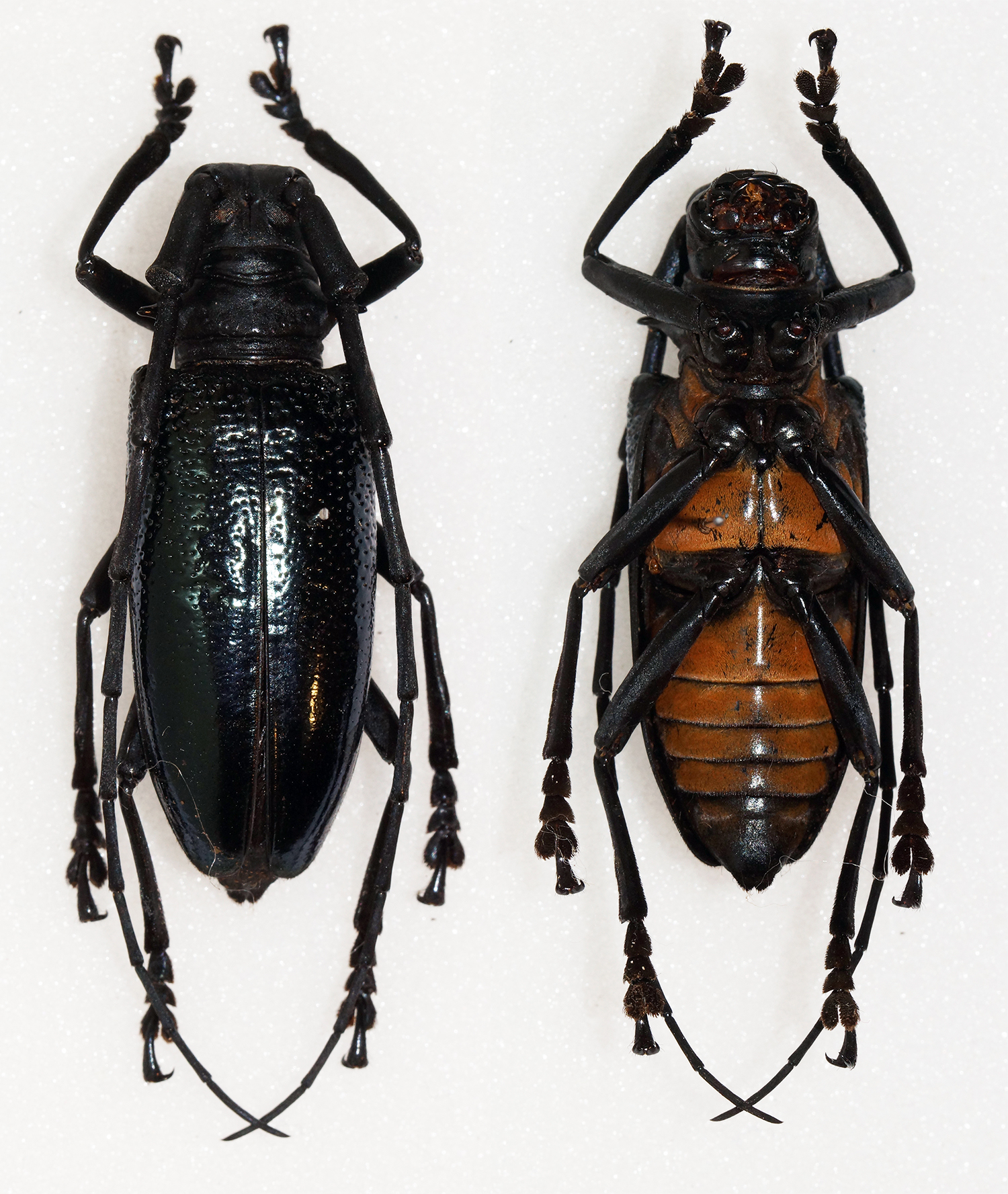

Scientific classification
- Kingdom: Animalia
- Phylum: Arthropoda
- Class: Insecta
- Order: Coleoptera
- Suborder: Polyphaga
- Infraorder: Cucujiformia
- Family: Cerambycidae
- Genus: Nemophas
- Species: N. cyanescens

Binomial name
- Nemophas cyanescens Jordan, 1898

Synonyms
- Nemophas atrocyaneus Heller, 1919

= Nemophas cyanescens =

Species of beetle

Nemophas cyanescens is a species of beetle in the family Cerambycidae. It was described by Karl Jordan in 1898. It is known from Moluccas.
