= Tetraglenes breviceps =

Scientific classification
- Domain: Eukaryota
- Kingdom: Animalia
- Phylum: Arthropoda
- Class: Insecta
- Order: Coleoptera
- Suborder: Polyphaga
- Infraorder: Cucujiformia
- Family: Cerambycidae
- Genus: Tetraglenes
- Species: T. breviceps

Binomial name
- Tetraglenes breviceps Kolbe, 1894

Species of beetle

Tetraglenes breviceps is a species of beetle in the family Cerambycidae. It was described by Kolbe in 1894.
