= Nephelotus conspersus =

Scientific classification
- Kingdom: Animalia
- Phylum: Arthropoda
- Clade: Pancrustacea
- Class: Insecta
- Order: Coleoptera
- Suborder: Polyphaga
- Infraorder: Cucujiformia
- Family: Cerambycidae
- Genus: Nephelotus
- Species: N. conspersus

Binomial name
- Nephelotus conspersus (J. Thomson, 1865)

Synonyms
- Anhammus conspersus J. Thomson, 1865; Nephelotus licheneus Pascoe, 1866

Species of beetle

Nephelotus conspersus is a species of beetle in the family Cerambycidae. It was described by James Thomson in 1865. It is known from Malaysia, Java, Borneo and Sumatra.
