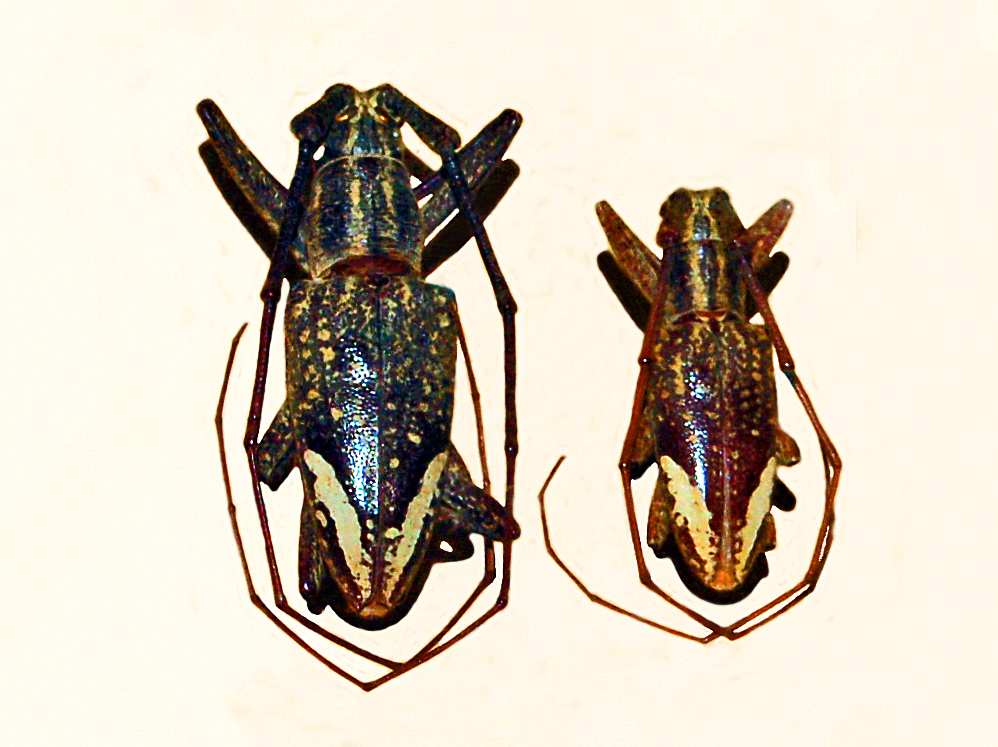
- Pelargoderus rubropunctatus from New Guinea

Scientific classification
- Kingdom: Animalia
- Phylum: Arthropoda
- Class: Insecta
- Order: Coleoptera
- Suborder: Polyphaga
- Infraorder: Cucujiformia
- Family: Cerambycidae
- Genus: Pelargoderus
- Species: P. rubropunctatus

Binomial name
- Pelargoderus rubropunctatus (Guérin-Méneville, 1838)

Synonyms
- Paragnoma acuminipennis; Saperda rubropunctata Guérin, 1838; Pelargoderus arouensis (Thomson) Auct.; Lamia rubropunctatus Guérin-Méneville, 1838

= Pelargoderus rubropunctatus =

Species of beetle

Pelargoderus rubropunctatus is a species of beetle belonging to Lamiini tribe of the longhorn beetle family, Cerambycidae, first described in 1831 by Félix Édouard Guérin-Méneville as Lamia rubropunctatus.

== Description ==
Pelargoderus rubropunctatus can reach a length of about 30 millimetres (1.2 in).

== Distribution ==
This species can be found in Moluccas (Aru Islands, Kai Islands), New Guinea and Australia (Queensland).
