= Nemophas ammiralis =

Scientific classification
- Domain: Eukaryota
- Kingdom: Animalia
- Phylum: Arthropoda
- Class: Insecta
- Order: Coleoptera
- Suborder: Polyphaga
- Infraorder: Cucujiformia
- Family: Cerambycidae
- Tribe: Lamiini
- Genus: Nemophas
- Species: N. ammiralis

Binomial name
- Nemophas ammiralis Schwarzer, 1931

Synonyms
- Anoplophora ammiralis (Schwarzer) Breuning, 1944

Species of beetle

Nemophas ammiralis is a species of beetle in the family Cerambycidae. It was described by Bernhard Schwarzer in 1931.
