= Tetraglenes ceylonensis =

Scientific classification
- Kingdom: Animalia
- Phylum: Arthropoda
- Class: Insecta
- Order: Coleoptera
- Suborder: Polyphaga
- Infraorder: Cucujiformia
- Family: Cerambycidae
- Genus: Tetraglenes
- Species: T. ceylonensis

Binomial name
- Tetraglenes ceylonensis Breuning, 1942

Species of beetle

Tetraglenes ceylonensis is a species of beetle belonging to the family Cerambycidae. It was described by Breuning in 1942.
