= Tetraglenes annamensis =

Scientific classification
- Kingdom: Animalia
- Phylum: Arthropoda
- Clade: Pancrustacea
- Class: Insecta
- Order: Coleoptera
- Suborder: Polyphaga
- Infraorder: Cucujiformia
- Family: Cerambycidae
- Genus: Tetraglenes
- Species: T. annamensis

Binomial name
- Tetraglenes annamensis Breuning, 1943

Species of beetle

Tetraglenes annamensis is a species of beetle in the family Cerambycidae. It was described by Breuning in 1943.
