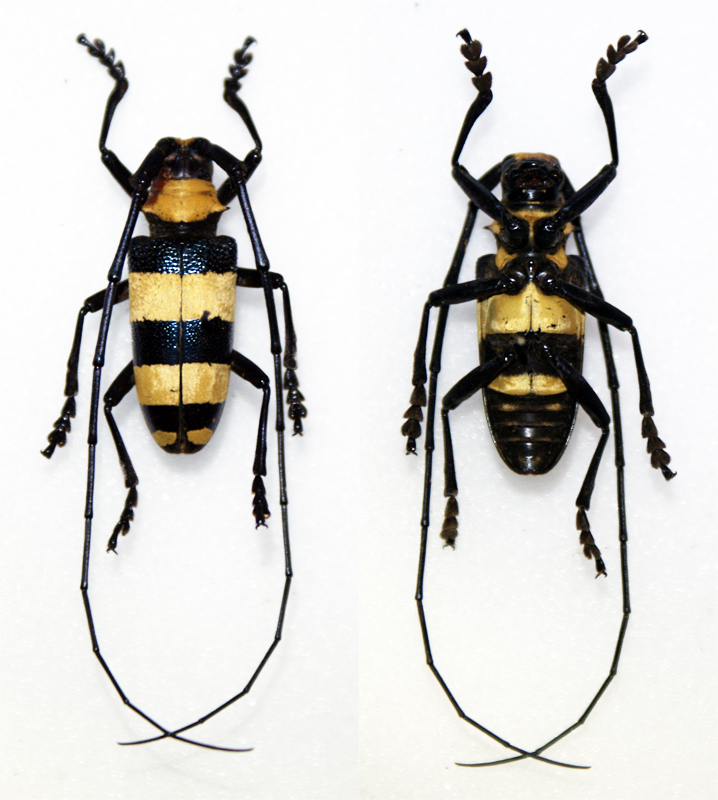

Scientific classification
- Kingdom: Animalia
- Phylum: Arthropoda
- Clade: Pancrustacea
- Class: Insecta
- Order: Coleoptera
- Suborder: Polyphaga
- Infraorder: Cucujiformia
- Family: Cerambycidae
- Genus: Nemophas
- Species: N. bicinctus

Binomial name
- Nemophas bicinctus Lansberge, 1880

= Nemophas bicinctus =

Species of beetle

Nemophas bicinctus is a species of beetle in the family Cerambycidae. It was described by Lansberge in 1880. It is known from Sulawesi and Moluccas.
