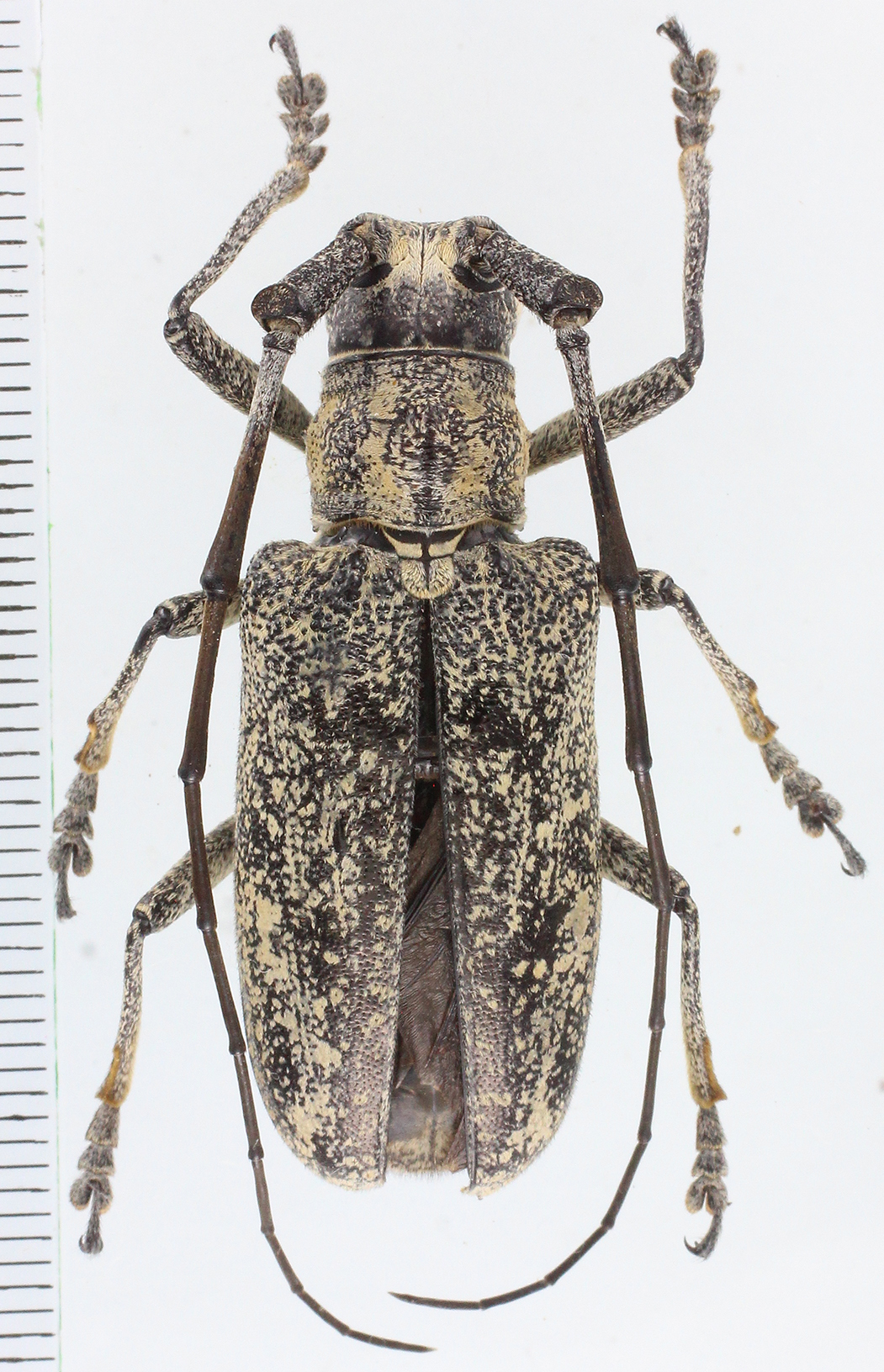

Scientific classification
- Kingdom: Animalia
- Phylum: Arthropoda
- Class: Insecta
- Order: Coleoptera
- Suborder: Polyphaga
- Infraorder: Cucujiformia
- Family: Cerambycidae
- Genus: Pelargoderus
- Species: P. fulvoirroratus

Binomial name
- Pelargoderus fulvoirroratus (Blanchard, 1853)

Synonyms
- Monochamus hector Pascoe, 1862; Monohammus fulvoirroratus Blanchard, 1853; Pelargoderus hector (Pascoe, 1862)

= Pelargoderus fulvoirroratus =

Species of beetle

Pelargoderus fulvoirroratus is a species of beetle in the family Cerambycidae. It was first described by Blanchard in 1853 and is known from the Moluccas.
