= Tetraglenes setosa =

Scientific classification
- Kingdom: Animalia
- Phylum: Arthropoda
- Class: Insecta
- Order: Coleoptera
- Suborder: Polyphaga
- Infraorder: Cucujiformia
- Family: Cerambycidae
- Genus: Tetraglenes
- Species: T. setosa

Binomial name
- Tetraglenes setosa Breuning, 1942

Species of beetle

Tetraglenes setosa is a species of beetle in the family Cerambycidae. Its distribution can be found in Kenya. It was described by Breuning in 1942.
