= Pelargoderus djampeanus =

Scientific classification
- Kingdom: Animalia
- Phylum: Arthropoda
- Class: Insecta
- Order: Coleoptera
- Suborder: Polyphaga
- Infraorder: Cucujiformia
- Family: Cerambycidae
- Genus: Pelargoderus
- Species: P. djampeanus

Binomial name
- Pelargoderus djampeanus Breuning, 1960

Species of beetle

Pelargoderus djampeanus is a species of beetle in the family Cerambycidae. It was described by Stephan von Breuning in 1960.
