= Tetraglenes nimbae =

Scientific classification
- Kingdom: Animalia
- Phylum: Arthropoda
- Class: Insecta
- Order: Coleoptera
- Suborder: Polyphaga
- Infraorder: Cucujiformia
- Family: Cerambycidae
- Genus: Tetraglenes
- Species: T. nimbae

Binomial name
- Tetraglenes nimbae Lepesme, 1952

Species of beetle

Tetraglenes nimbae is a species of beetle in the family Cerambycidae. It was described by Lepesme in 1952.
