= Nephelotus alboplagiatus =

Scientific classification
- Kingdom: Animalia
- Phylum: Arthropoda
- Class: Insecta
- Order: Coleoptera
- Suborder: Polyphaga
- Infraorder: Cucujiformia
- Family: Cerambycidae
- Genus: Nephelotus
- Species: N. alboplagiatus

Binomial name
- Nephelotus alboplagiatus Breuning, 1938

Species of beetle

Nephelotus alboplagiatus is a species of beetle in the family Cerambycidae. It was described by Stephan von Breuning in 1938. It is known from Sumatra.
