= Pelargoderus assimilis =

Scientific classification
- Kingdom: Animalia
- Phylum: Arthropoda
- Class: Insecta
- Order: Coleoptera
- Suborder: Polyphaga
- Infraorder: Cucujiformia
- Family: Cerambycidae
- Genus: Pelargoderus
- Species: P. assimilis

Binomial name
- Pelargoderus assimilis Aurivillius, 1908

Species of beetle

Pelargoderus assimilis is a species of beetle in the family Cerambycidae. It was described by Per Olof Christopher Aurivillius in 1908.
