= Pelargoderus luteosparsus =

Scientific classification
- Kingdom: Animalia
- Phylum: Arthropoda
- Class: Insecta
- Order: Coleoptera
- Suborder: Polyphaga
- Infraorder: Cucujiformia
- Family: Cerambycidae
- Genus: Pelargoderus
- Species: P. luteosparsus

Binomial name
- Pelargoderus luteosparsus (Matsushita, 1935)

Synonyms
- Nanyohammus luteosparsus Matsushita, 1935

Species of beetle

Pelargoderus luteosparsus is a species of beetle in the family Cerambycidae. It is known from Masaki Matsushita in 1935, originally under the genus Nanyohammus. It feeds on Theobroma cacao and Artocarpus altilis.
