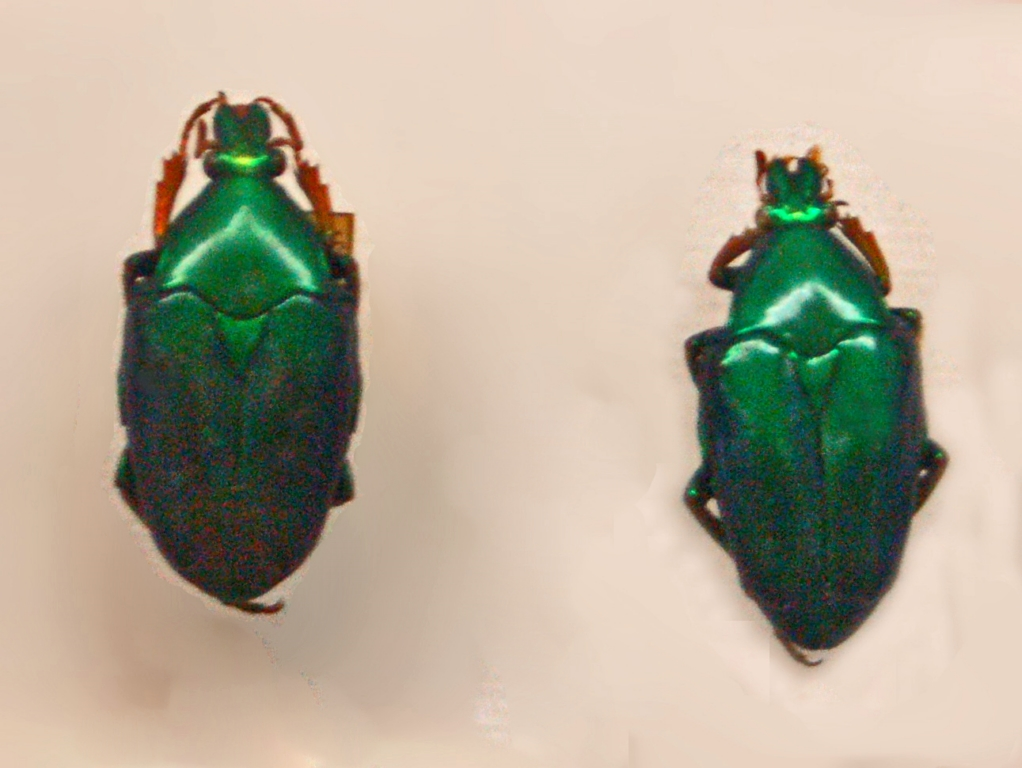
- Pseudochalcothea auripes at National Museum (Prague)

Scientific classification
- Kingdom: Animalia
- Phylum: Arthropoda
- Clade: Pancrustacea
- Class: Insecta
- Order: Coleoptera
- Suborder: Polyphaga
- Infraorder: Scarabaeiformia
- Family: Scarabaeidae
- Genus: Pseudochalcothea
- Species: P. auripes

Binomial name
- Pseudochalcothea auripes (Westwood, 1874)

Synonyms
- Chalcothea auripes Westwood, 1874

= Pseudochalcothea auripes =

Species of beetle

Pseudochalcothea auripes is a beetle of the family Scarabaeidae and subfamily Cetoniinae.

== Description and Distribution ==
This species can reach about 30–35 millimetres (1.2–1.4 in) in length. It is endemic to Malaysia and Borneo.
