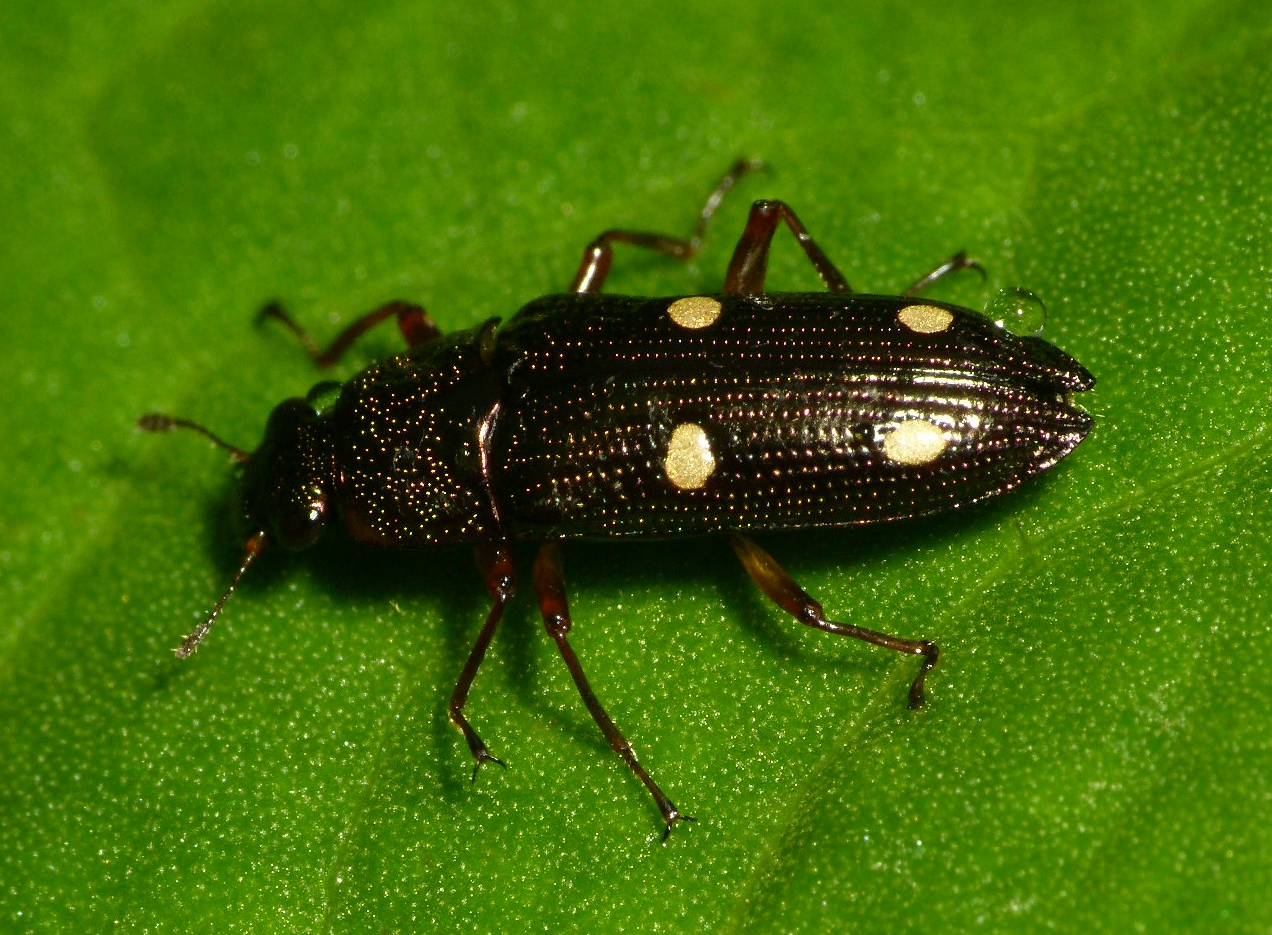
- Neohelota sp.

Scientific classification
- Kingdom: Animalia
- Phylum: Arthropoda
- Clade: Pancrustacea
- Class: Insecta
- Order: Coleoptera
- Suborder: Polyphaga
- Infraorder: Cucujiformia
- Superfamily: Cucujoidea
- Family: Helotidae; Chapuis, 1876

Genera
- Helota; Neohelota; Afrohelotina; Metahelotella; Strophohelota; †Palaeohelota; †Metahelotella; †Trihelota; †Burmahelota

= Helotidae =

Helotidae Temporal range: Aptian–Recent

Family of beetles

Helotidae is a family of beetles, in the suborder Polyphaga. The family includes about five extant genera, Helota MacLeay, Neohelota Ohta, Afrohelotina Kirejtshuk, Metahelotella Kirejtshuk, and Strophohelota Kirejtshuk. Helotidae are found mainly in the Old World tropics and are absent from Australia and Madagascar. The antennae are clubbed on the final three segments and are retractable within grooves under the head. The wings have reduced venation with just 4 anal veins. Helotids are known to be associated with sap, fruit and flowers, and the larvae of some species are known to bore into wood in order to pupate.

A few fossil genera have been described including Palaeohelota from the Lower Cretaceous (Aptian) Yixian Formation in China, Burmahelota, Metahelotella and Trihelota from the Upper Cretaceous (Cenomanian) Burmese amber of Northern Myanmar. Another fossil genus Laodiscis placed in this family originally is now considered of uncertain taxonomic position.

== Additional sources ==
- Ritsema C. (1915) A systematic catalogue of the Coleopterous family Helotidae in the Leiden Museum Zoologische Mededelingen, Vol. 1 P. 125-139 PDF
- Wegrzynowicz P. (2000) Catalogue of the Helotidae (Coleoptera: Cucujoidea), Zoologische Mededelingen, Vol. 73 P. 391-411 PDF
