= Coenraad Ritsema =

Dutch entomologist (1846–1929)

Coenraad Ritsema, also Cornelius Conrad Ritsema (13 April 1846, Haarlem – 9 January 1929, Wageningen) was a Dutch entomologist.

Ritsema was a Curator at RMNH Rijksmuseum van Natuurlijke Historie (National Museum of Natural History) in Leiden from 1873 to 1916 and wrote many short papers describing new species of Hymenoptera and Coleoptera. As part of his duties at the Leiden museum he worked in other fields for instance on Decapoda.

He was a specialist on Helotidae.
