= Colobothea grallatrix =

Scientific classification
- Kingdom: Animalia
- Phylum: Arthropoda
- Class: Insecta
- Order: Coleoptera
- Suborder: Polyphaga
- Infraorder: Cucujiformia
- Family: Cerambycidae
- Genus: Colobothea
- Species: C. grallatrix

Binomial name
- Colobothea grallatrix (Bates, 1865)

Synonyms
- Cathexis grallatrix Zajciw, 1967

Species of beetle

Colobothea grallatrix is a species in the longhorn beetle family Cerambycidae. It was described by Bates in 1865. It is known from French Guiana, Brazil, and Ecuador.
