= Glenea rubricollis =

Scientific classification
- Domain: Eukaryota
- Kingdom: Animalia
- Phylum: Arthropoda
- Class: Insecta
- Order: Coleoptera
- Suborder: Polyphaga
- Infraorder: Cucujiformia
- Family: Cerambycidae
- Genus: Glenea
- Species: G. rubricollis

Binomial name
- Glenea rubricollis (Hope, 1842)

Synonyms
- Colobothea rubricollis Hope, 1842

Species of beetle

Glenea rubricollis is a species of beetle in the family Cerambycidae. It was described by Frederick William Hope in 1842, originally under the genus Colobothea. It is known from Vietnam and India.
