= Glenea leucospilota =

Scientific classification
- Kingdom: Animalia
- Phylum: Arthropoda
- Class: Insecta
- Order: Coleoptera
- Suborder: Polyphaga
- Infraorder: Cucujiformia
- Family: Cerambycidae
- Genus: Glenea
- Species: G. leucospilota

Binomial name
- Glenea leucospilota (Westwood, 1841)

Synonyms
- Colobothea albonotata Westwood, 1841; Colobothea leucospilota Westwood, 1841; Parazosne leucospilota (Westwood, 1841); Saperda albonotata (Westwood, 1841)

Species of beetle

Glenea leucospilota is a species of beetle in the family Cerambycidae. It was described by John O. Westwood in 1841, originally under the genus Colobothea. It is known from the Philippines.
