= Colobothea signativentris =

Scientific classification
- Domain: Eukaryota
- Kingdom: Animalia
- Phylum: Arthropoda
- Class: Insecta
- Order: Coleoptera
- Suborder: Polyphaga
- Infraorder: Cucujiformia
- Family: Cerambycidae
- Genus: Colobothea
- Species: C. signativentris

Binomial name
- Colobothea signativentris Gahan, 1889

Species of beetle

Colobothea signativentris is a species of beetle in the family Cerambycidae. It was described by Gahan in 1889. It is known from Brazil.
