= Colobothea varia =

Scientific classification
- Kingdom: Animalia
- Phylum: Arthropoda
- Class: Insecta
- Order: Coleoptera
- Suborder: Polyphaga
- Infraorder: Cucujiformia
- Family: Cerambycidae
- Genus: Colobothea
- Species: C. varia

Binomial name
- Colobothea varia (Fabricius, 1787)

Species of beetle

Colobothea varia is a species of beetle in the family Cerambycidae. It was described by Johan Christian Fabricius in 1787. It is known from Venezuela, Panama, and French Guiana.
