= Colobothea seriatomaculata =

Scientific classification
- Domain: Eukaryota
- Kingdom: Animalia
- Phylum: Arthropoda
- Class: Insecta
- Order: Coleoptera
- Suborder: Polyphaga
- Infraorder: Cucujiformia
- Family: Cerambycidae
- Genus: Colobothea
- Species: C. seriatomaculata

Binomial name
- Colobothea seriatomaculata Zajciw, 1962

Species of beetle

Colobothea seriatomaculata is a species of beetle in the family Cerambycidae. It was described by Dmytro Zajciw in 1962. It is known from Argentina, Brazil and Paraguay.
