= Colobothea macularis =

Scientific classification
- Kingdom: Animalia
- Phylum: Arthropoda
- Clade: Pancrustacea
- Class: Insecta
- Order: Coleoptera
- Suborder: Polyphaga
- Infraorder: Cucujiformia
- Family: Cerambycidae
- Genus: Colobothea
- Species: C. macularis

Binomial name
- Colobothea macularis (Olivier, 1792)

Species of beetle

Colobothea macularis is a species of beetle in the family Cerambycidae. It was described by Guillaume-Antoine Olivier in 1792. It is known from Brazil, Ecuador, French Guiana, Peru, and Suriname.
