= Colobothea subcincta =

Scientific classification
- Domain: Eukaryota
- Kingdom: Animalia
- Phylum: Arthropoda
- Class: Insecta
- Order: Coleoptera
- Suborder: Polyphaga
- Infraorder: Cucujiformia
- Family: Cerambycidae
- Genus: Colobothea
- Species: C. subcincta

Binomial name
- Colobothea subcincta Laporte, 1840

Synonyms
- Colobothea albobimaculata Zajciw, 1961; Colobothea pseudosubcincta Zajciw, 1961

Species of beetle

Colobothea subcincta is a species of beetle in the family Cerambycidae. It was described by Laporte in 1840. It is known from Brazil.
