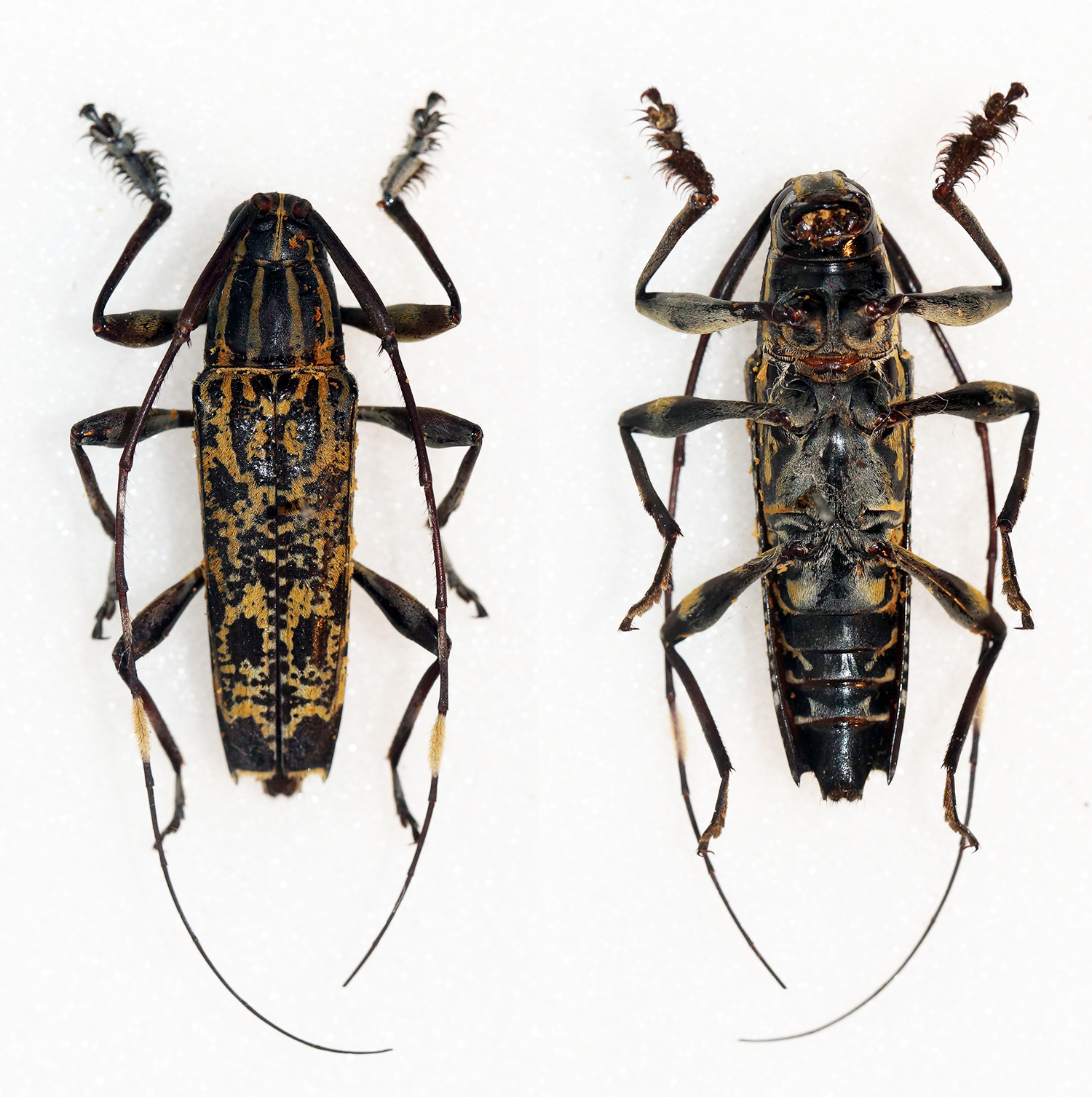

Scientific classification
- Domain: Eukaryota
- Kingdom: Animalia
- Phylum: Arthropoda
- Class: Insecta
- Order: Coleoptera
- Suborder: Polyphaga
- Infraorder: Cucujiformia
- Family: Cerambycidae
- Genus: Colobothea
- Species: C. hirtipes

Binomial name
- Colobothea hirtipes (DeGeer, 1775)

= Colobothea hirtipes =

Species of beetle

Colobothea hirtipes is a species of beetle in the family Cerambycidae. It was described by DeGeer in 1775. It is known from Bolivia, Brazil, Guyana, French Guiana, Suriname, and Peru.
