= Colobothea cincticornis =

Scientific classification
- Kingdom: Animalia
- Phylum: Arthropoda
- Clade: Pancrustacea
- Class: Insecta
- Order: Coleoptera
- Suborder: Polyphaga
- Infraorder: Cucujiformia
- Family: Cerambycidae
- Genus: Colobothea
- Species: C. cincticornis

Binomial name
- Colobothea cincticornis (Schaller, 1783)

Species of beetle

Colobothea cincticornis is a species of beetle in the family Cerambycidae. It was described by Schaller in 1783.
