= Colobothea plebeja =

Scientific classification
- Domain: Eukaryota
- Kingdom: Animalia
- Phylum: Arthropoda
- Class: Insecta
- Order: Coleoptera
- Suborder: Polyphaga
- Infraorder: Cucujiformia
- Family: Cerambycidae
- Genus: Colobothea
- Species: C. plebeja

Binomial name
- Colobothea plebeja Aurivillius, 1902

Species of beetle

Colobothea plebeja is a species of beetle in the family Cerambycidae. It was described by Per Olof Christopher Aurivillius in 1902. It is known from Bolivia and Peru.
