= Colobothea guatemalena =

Scientific classification
- Domain: Eukaryota
- Kingdom: Animalia
- Phylum: Arthropoda
- Class: Insecta
- Order: Coleoptera
- Suborder: Polyphaga
- Infraorder: Cucujiformia
- Family: Cerambycidae
- Genus: Colobothea
- Species: C. guatemalena

Binomial name
- Colobothea guatemalena Bates, 1881

Species of beetle

Colobothea guatemalena is a species of beetle in the family Cerambycidae. It was described by Henry Walter Bates in 1881.
