= Colobothea osculatii =

Scientific classification
- Domain: Eukaryota
- Kingdom: Animalia
- Phylum: Arthropoda
- Class: Insecta
- Order: Coleoptera
- Suborder: Polyphaga
- Infraorder: Cucujiformia
- Family: Cerambycidae
- Genus: Colobothea
- Species: C. osculatii

Binomial name
- Colobothea osculatii Guérin-Méneville, 1855

Species of beetle

Colobothea osculatii is a species of beetle in the family Cerambycidae. It was described by Félix Édouard Guérin-Méneville in 1855. It is known from Ecuador and Peru.
