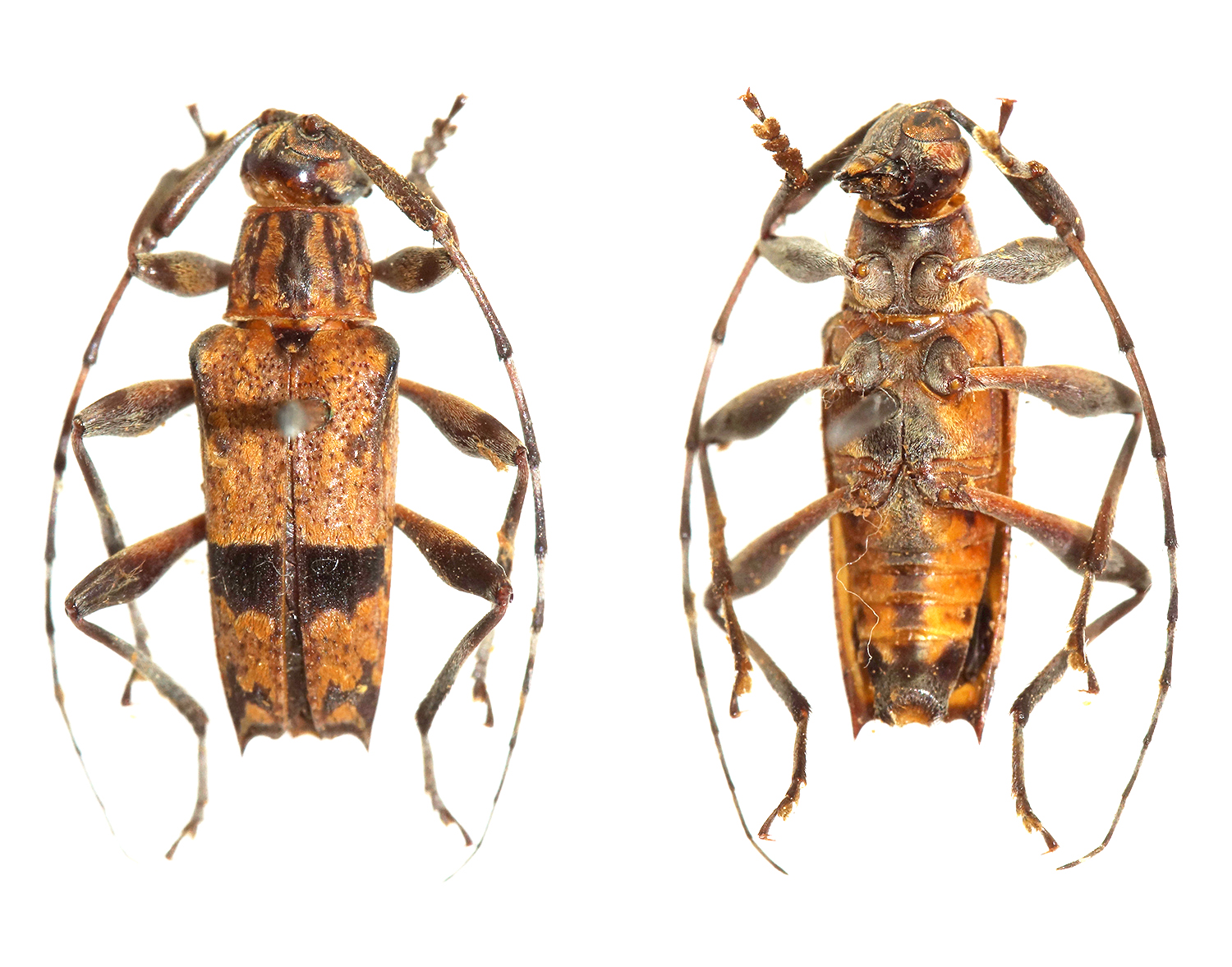

Scientific classification
- Kingdom: Animalia
- Phylum: Arthropoda
- Clade: Pancrustacea
- Class: Insecta
- Order: Coleoptera
- Suborder: Polyphaga
- Infraorder: Cucujiformia
- Family: Cerambycidae
- Genus: Colobothea
- Species: C. fasciata

Binomial name
- Colobothea fasciata Bates, 1865

= Colobothea fasciata =

Species of beetle

Colobothea fasciata is a species of beetle in the family Cerambycidae. It was described by Bates in 1865. It is known from Argentina, Brazil and Paraguay.
