= Colobothea erythrophthalma =

Scientific classification
- Domain: Eukaryota
- Kingdom: Animalia
- Phylum: Arthropoda
- Class: Insecta
- Order: Coleoptera
- Suborder: Polyphaga
- Infraorder: Cucujiformia
- Family: Cerambycidae
- Genus: Colobothea
- Species: C. erythrophthalma

Binomial name
- Colobothea erythrophthalma (Voet, 1806)

Species of beetle

Colobothea erythrophthalma is a species of beetle in the Cerambycidae family. It was described by Voet in 1806.
