= Colobothea fasciatipennis =

Scientific classification
- Domain: Eukaryota
- Kingdom: Animalia
- Phylum: Arthropoda
- Class: Insecta
- Order: Coleoptera
- Suborder: Polyphaga
- Infraorder: Cucujiformia
- Family: Cerambycidae
- Genus: Colobothea
- Species: C. fasciatipennis

Binomial name
- Colobothea fasciatipennis Linsley, 1935

Species of beetle

Colobothea fasciatipennis is a species of beetle in the family Cerambycidae. It was described by Linsley in 1935. It is known from Honduras and Panama.
