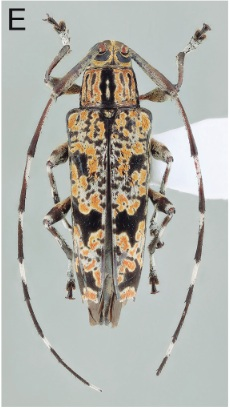

Scientific classification
- Kingdom: Animalia
- Phylum: Arthropoda
- Clade: Pancrustacea
- Class: Insecta
- Order: Coleoptera
- Suborder: Polyphaga
- Infraorder: Cucujiformia
- Family: Cerambycidae
- Genus: Colobothea
- Species: C. rubroornata

Binomial name
- Colobothea rubroornata Zajciw, 1962

= Colobothea rubroornata =

Species of beetle

Colobothea rubroornata is a species of beetle in the family Cerambycidae. It was described by Dmytro Zajciw in 1962. It is known from Bolivia, Brazil and Paraguay.
