= Colobothea dispersa =

Scientific classification
- Domain: Eukaryota
- Kingdom: Animalia
- Phylum: Arthropoda
- Class: Insecta
- Order: Coleoptera
- Suborder: Polyphaga
- Infraorder: Cucujiformia
- Family: Cerambycidae
- Genus: Colobothea
- Species: C. dispersa

Binomial name
- Colobothea dispersa Bates, 1872

Species of beetle

Colobothea dispersa is a species of beetle in the family Cerambycidae. It was described by Bates in 1872. It is known from Honduras and Colombia.
