= Colobothea colombiana =

Scientific classification
- Domain: Eukaryota
- Kingdom: Animalia
- Phylum: Arthropoda
- Class: Insecta
- Order: Coleoptera
- Suborder: Polyphaga
- Infraorder: Cucujiformia
- Family: Cerambycidae
- Genus: Colobothea
- Species: C. colombiana

Binomial name
- Colobothea colombiana Monné, 1993

Species of beetle

Colobothea colombiana is a species of beetle in the family Cerambycidae. It was described by Monné in 1993. It is known from Colombia.
