= Colobothea fibrosa =

Scientific classification
- Kingdom: Animalia
- Phylum: Arthropoda
- Class: Insecta
- Order: Coleoptera
- Suborder: Polyphaga
- Infraorder: Cucujiformia
- Family: Cerambycidae
- Genus: Colobothea
- Species: C. fibrosa

Binomial name
- Colobothea fibrosa Erichson, 1847

Species of beetle

Colobothea fibrosa is a species of beetle in the family Cerambycidae. It was described by Wilhelm Ferdinand Erichson in 1847. It is known from Peru.
