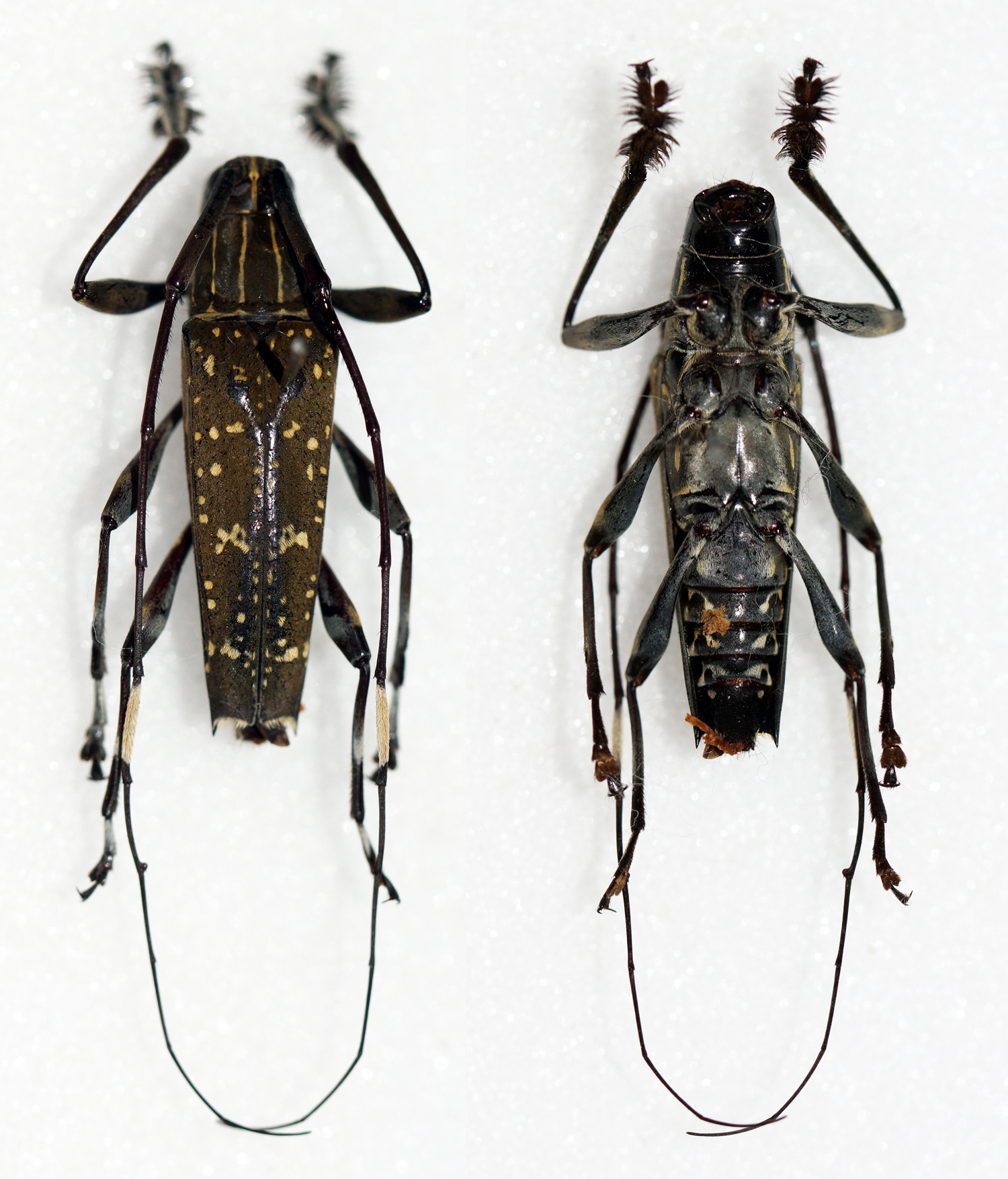

Scientific classification
- Kingdom: Animalia
- Phylum: Arthropoda
- Class: Insecta
- Order: Coleoptera
- Suborder: Polyphaga
- Infraorder: Cucujiformia
- Family: Cerambycidae
- Genus: Colobothea
- Species: C. bicuspidata

Binomial name
- Colobothea bicuspidata (Latreille, 1811)

= Colobothea bicuspidata =

Species of beetle

Colobothea bicuspidata is a species of beetle in the family Cerambycidae. It was described by Pierre André Latreille in 1811. It is known from Bolivia, Brazil, Colombia, Peru, Ecuador, and French Guiana.
