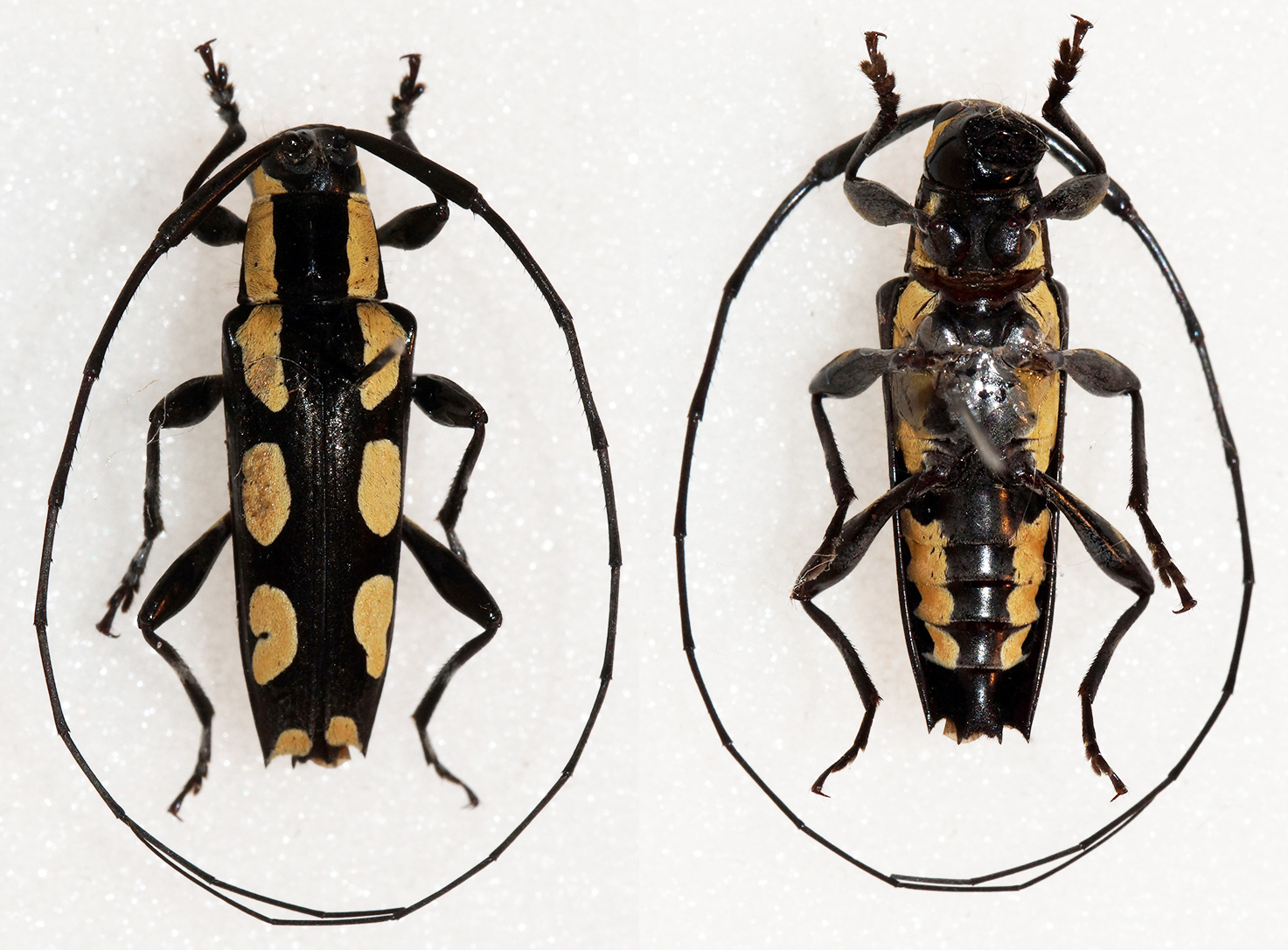

Scientific classification
- Kingdom: Animalia
- Phylum: Arthropoda
- Clade: Pancrustacea
- Class: Insecta
- Order: Coleoptera
- Suborder: Polyphaga
- Infraorder: Cucujiformia
- Family: Cerambycidae
- Genus: Colobothea
- Species: C. cassandra

Binomial name
- Colobothea cassandra (Dalman, 1823)

Synonyms
- Saperda cassandra Dalman, 1823; Saperda leucospila Germar, 1823

= Colobothea cassandra =

Species of beetle

Colobothea cassandra is a species of beetle in the family Cerambycidae. It was described by Dalman in 1823. It is known from Brazil and Paraguay.
