= Colobothea delicata =

Scientific classification
- Domain: Eukaryota
- Kingdom: Animalia
- Phylum: Arthropoda
- Class: Insecta
- Order: Coleoptera
- Suborder: Polyphaga
- Infraorder: Cucujiformia
- Family: Cerambycidae
- Genus: Colobothea
- Species: C. delicata

Binomial name
- Colobothea delicata Monné, 2005

Species of beetle

Colobothea delicata is a species of beetle in the family Cerambycidae. It was described by Monné in 2005. It is known from Costa Rica and Panama.
