= Colobothea lateralis =

Scientific classification
- Domain: Eukaryota
- Kingdom: Animalia
- Phylum: Arthropoda
- Class: Insecta
- Order: Coleoptera
- Suborder: Polyphaga
- Infraorder: Cucujiformia
- Family: Cerambycidae
- Genus: Colobothea
- Species: C. lateralis

Binomial name
- Colobothea lateralis Bates, 1865

Species of beetle

Colobothea lateralis is a species of beetle in the family Cerambycidae. It was described by Bates in 1865. It is known from Brazil.
