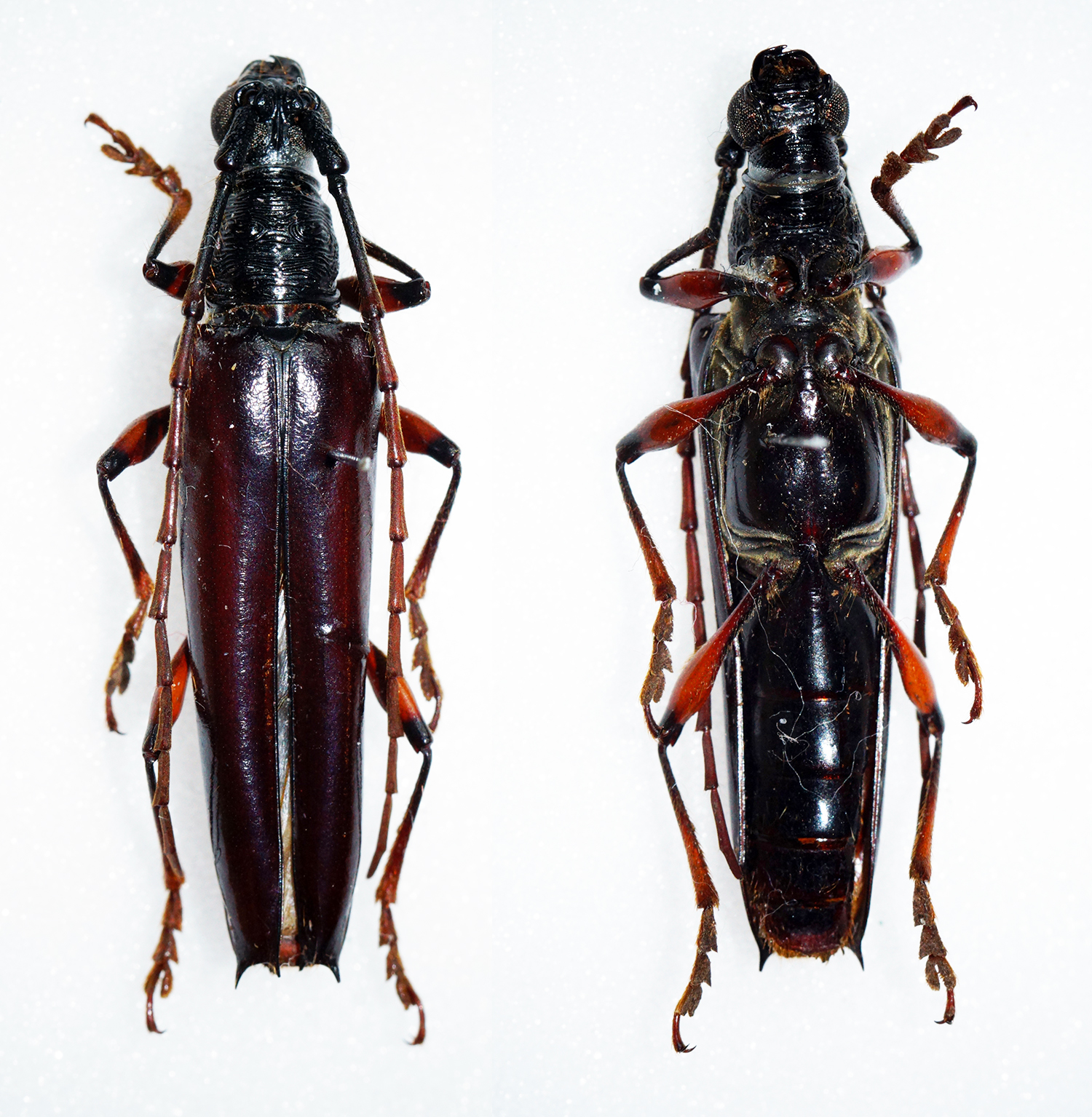

Scientific classification
- Domain: Eukaryota
- Kingdom: Animalia
- Phylum: Arthropoda
- Class: Insecta
- Order: Coleoptera
- Suborder: Polyphaga
- Infraorder: Cucujiformia
- Family: Cerambycidae
- Genus: Colobothea
- Species: C. distincta

Binomial name
- Colobothea distincta Pascoe, 1866

= Colobothea distincta =

Species of beetle

Colobothea distincta is a species of beetle in the family Cerambycidae. It was described by Pascoe in 1866. It is known from Mexico and Colombia.
