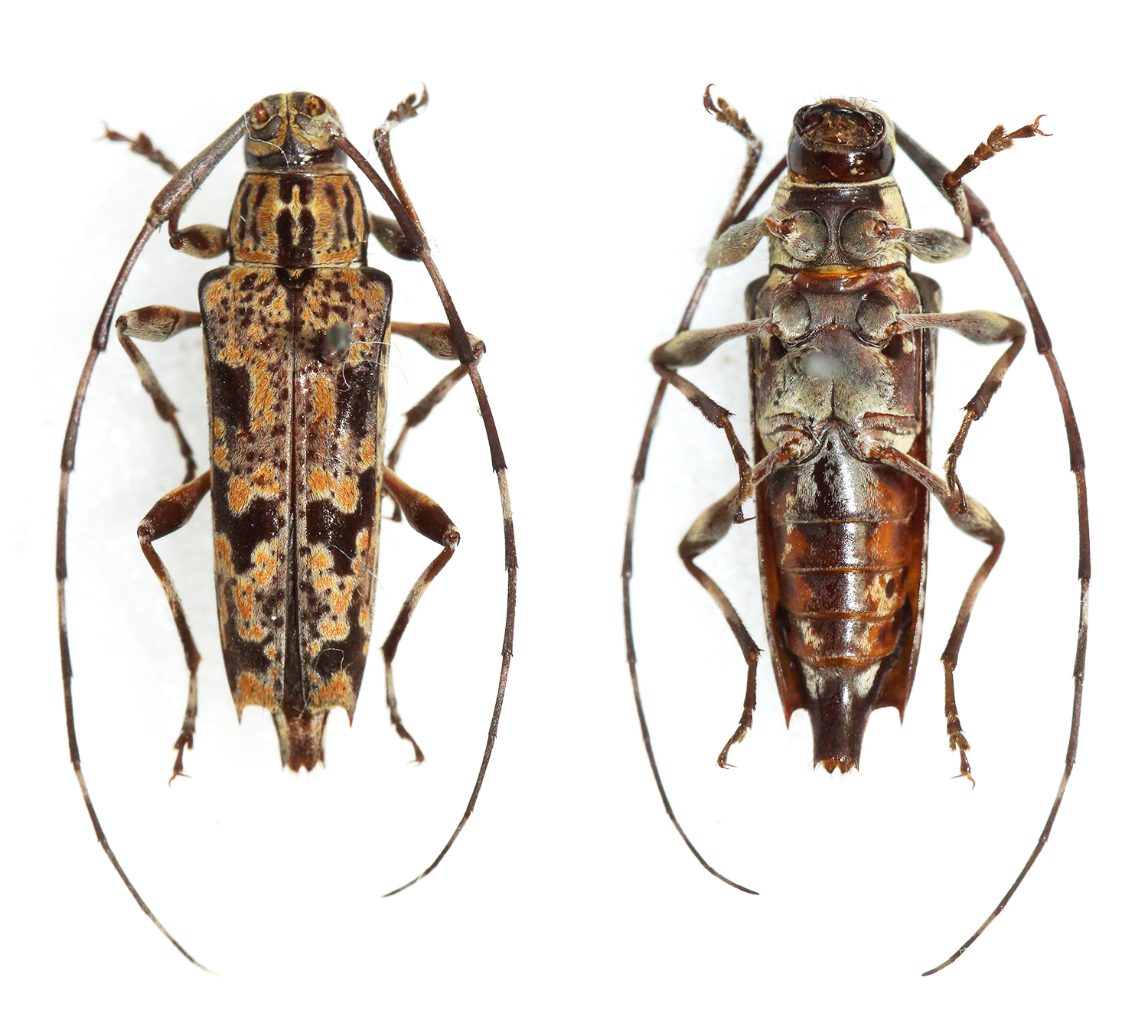

Scientific classification
- Kingdom: Animalia
- Phylum: Arthropoda
- Class: Insecta
- Order: Coleoptera
- Suborder: Polyphaga
- Infraorder: Cucujiformia
- Family: Cerambycidae
- Genus: Colobothea
- Species: C. passerina

Binomial name
- Colobothea passerina Erichson in Schomburg, 1848

= Colobothea passerina =

Species of beetle

Colobothea passerina is a species of beetle in the family Cerambycidae. It was described by Wilhelm Ferdinand Erichson in 1848. It is known from Guyana and French Guiana.
