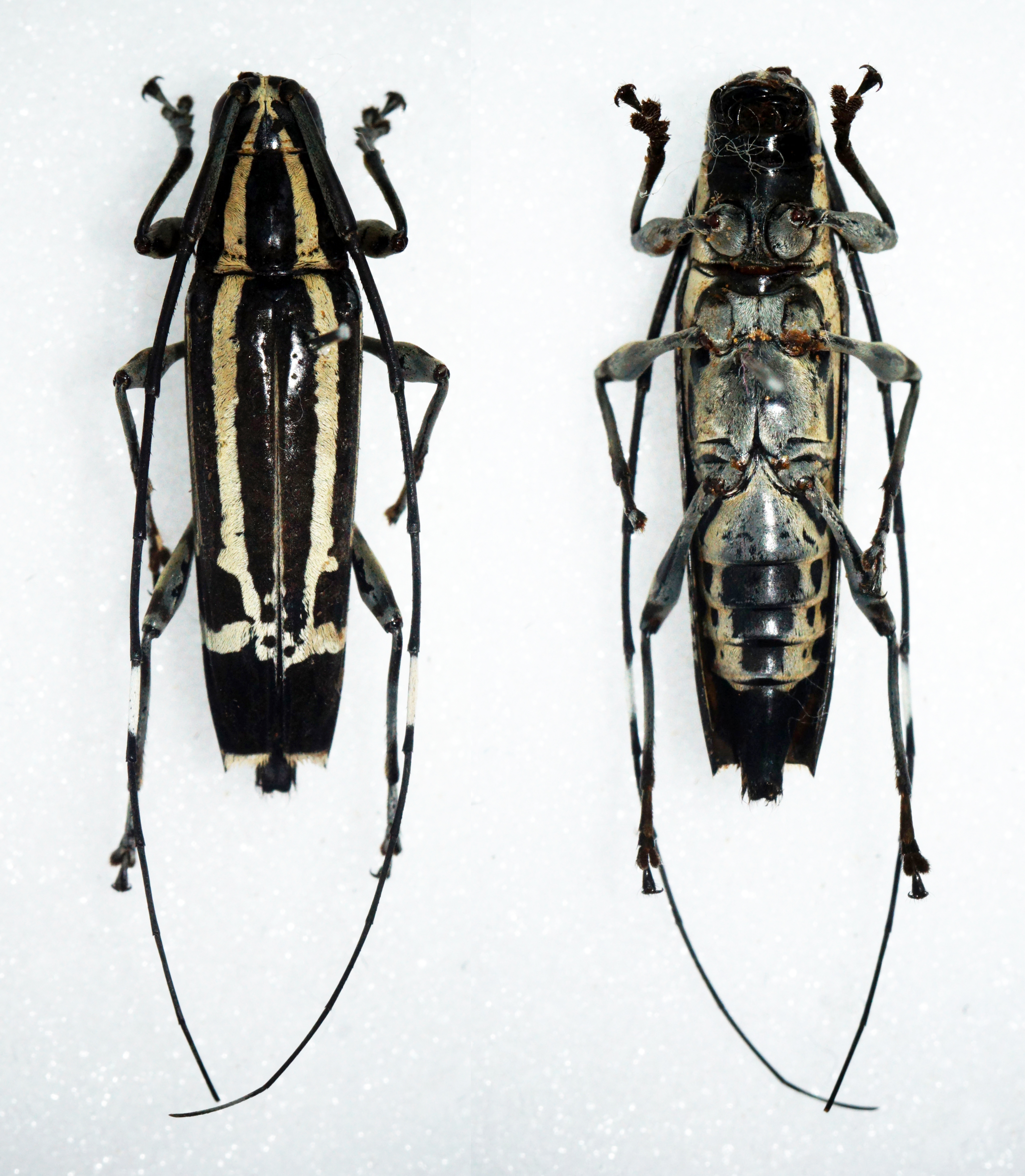

Scientific classification
- Domain: Eukaryota
- Kingdom: Animalia
- Phylum: Arthropoda
- Class: Insecta
- Order: Coleoptera
- Suborder: Polyphaga
- Infraorder: Cucujiformia
- Family: Cerambycidae
- Genus: Colobothea
- Species: C. lunulata

Binomial name
- Colobothea lunulata H. Lucas, 1859

= Colobothea lunulata =

Species of beetle

Colobothea lunulata is a species of beetle in the family Cerambycidae. It was described by Hippolyte Lucas in 1859. It is known from Bolivia, Brazil, Ecuador and Peru.
