= Colobothea flavimacula =

Scientific classification
- Domain: Eukaryota
- Kingdom: Animalia
- Phylum: Arthropoda
- Class: Insecta
- Order: Coleoptera
- Suborder: Polyphaga
- Infraorder: Cucujiformia
- Family: Cerambycidae
- Genus: Colobothea
- Species: C. flavimacula

Binomial name
- Colobothea flavimacula (Voet, 1806)

Species of beetle

Colobothea flavimacula is a species of beetle in the family Cerambycidae. It was described by Voet in 1806. It is known from South America.
