= Colobothea hondurena =

Scientific classification
- Domain: Eukaryota
- Kingdom: Animalia
- Phylum: Arthropoda
- Class: Insecta
- Order: Coleoptera
- Suborder: Polyphaga
- Infraorder: Cucujiformia
- Family: Cerambycidae
- Genus: Colobothea
- Species: C. hondurena

Binomial name
- Colobothea hondurena Giesbert, 1979

Species of beetle

Colobothea hondurena is a species of beetle in the family Cerambycidae. It was described by Giesbert in 1979.

According to Zajciw and Gilmour, the primary region of distribution for Colobothea hondurena is South America. Specimens are not particularly rare in collections, and over 9,000 have been scrutinized in research. On the dead or decaying trunks and branches of hardwood trees, they can be found both during the day and at night (Edmund, 1979, p. 415). Males have a medium-sized, convex, integument-piceous bodies covered in a pattern of pale markings and minute brown vestiture (Edmund, 1979, p. 436). Males have slightly longer legs and slightly more robust bodies than females, which are also slightly thinner. Their head is wider than the frons and somewhat taller than the bottom lobe of their eyes, and their antennae are more than 1.5 times longer than their bodies (Edmund, 1979, p. 436).
