= Colobothea berkovi =

Scientific classification
- Kingdom: Animalia
- Phylum: Arthropoda
- Class: Insecta
- Order: Coleoptera
- Suborder: Polyphaga
- Infraorder: Cucujiformia
- Family: Cerambycidae
- Genus: Colobothea
- Species: C. berkovi

Binomial name
- Colobothea berkovi Monné & Monné, 2010

Species of beetle

Colobothea berkovi is a species of flat-faced longhorn beetle in the genus Colobothea. It is known from specimens collected in Cochabamba, Bolivia.
