= Colobothea septemmaculata =

Scientific classification
- Domain: Eukaryota
- Kingdom: Animalia
- Phylum: Arthropoda
- Class: Insecta
- Order: Coleoptera
- Suborder: Polyphaga
- Infraorder: Cucujiformia
- Family: Cerambycidae
- Genus: Colobothea
- Species: C. septemmaculata

Binomial name
- Colobothea septemmaculata Zajciw, 1971

Species of beetle

Colobothea septemmaculata is a species of beetle in the family Cerambycidae. It was described by Dmytro Zajciw in 1971. It is known from Brazil and French Guiana.
