= Colobothea sexualis =

Scientific classification
- Kingdom: Animalia
- Phylum: Arthropoda
- Class: Insecta
- Order: Coleoptera
- Suborder: Polyphaga
- Infraorder: Cucujiformia
- Family: Cerambycidae
- Genus: Colobothea
- Species: C. sexualis

Binomial name
- Colobothea sexualis Casey, 1913

Species of beetle

Colobothea sexualis is a species of beetle in the family Cerambycidae. It was described by Casey in 1913. It is known from Mexico and Honduras.
