= Colobothea chemsaki =

Scientific classification
- Domain: Eukaryota
- Kingdom: Animalia
- Phylum: Arthropoda
- Class: Insecta
- Order: Coleoptera
- Suborder: Polyphaga
- Infraorder: Cucujiformia
- Family: Cerambycidae
- Genus: Colobothea
- Species: C. chemsaki

Binomial name
- Colobothea chemsaki Giesbert, 1979

Species of beetle

Colobothea chemsaki is a species of beetle in the family Cerambycidae. It was described by Giesbert in 1979. It is known from Costa Rica and Mexico.
