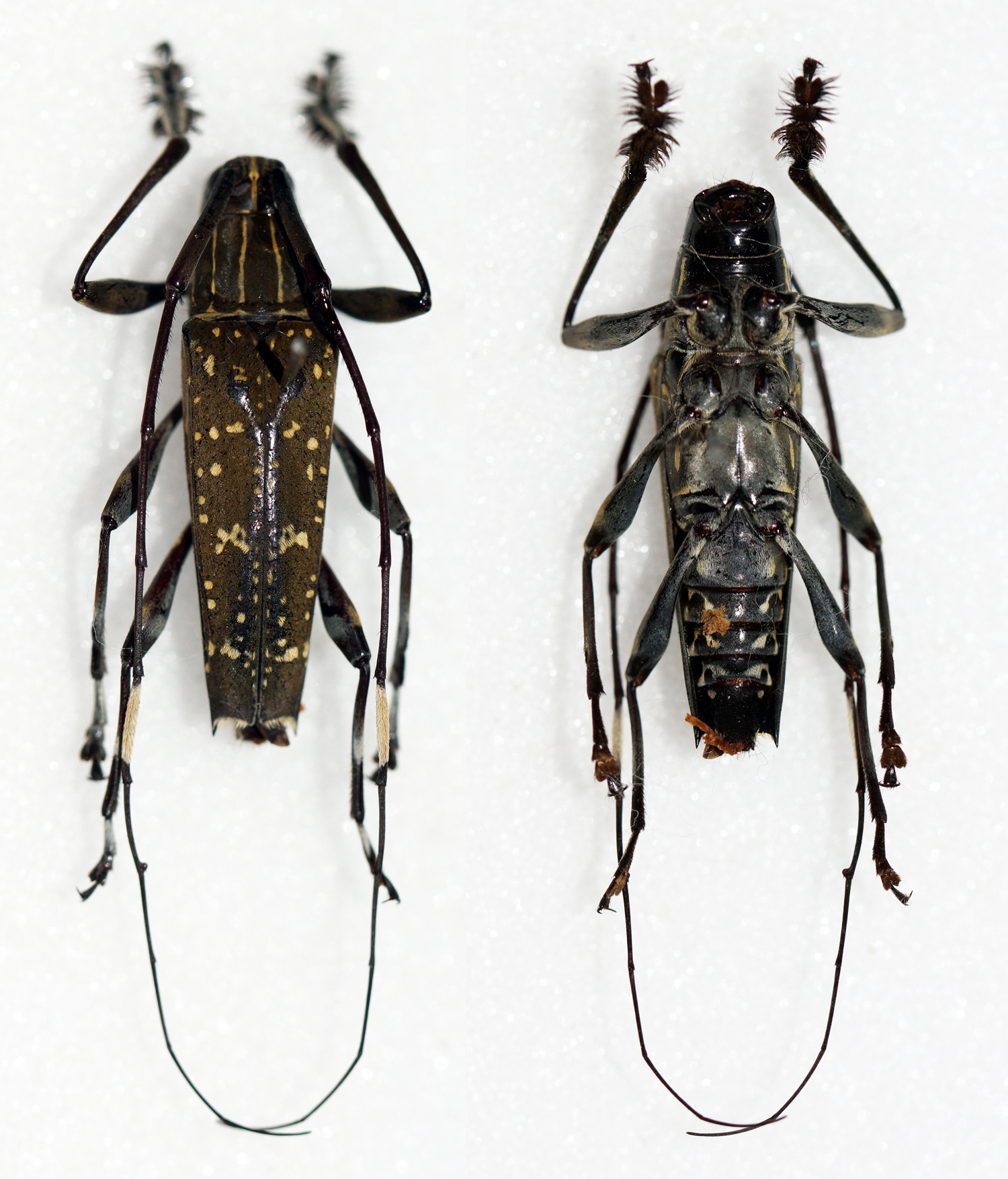
- Colobothea bicuspidata

Scientific classification
- Kingdom: Animalia
- Phylum: Arthropoda
- Class: Insecta
- Order: Coleoptera
- Suborder: Polyphaga
- Infraorder: Cucujiformia
- Family: Cerambycidae
- Subfamily: Lamiinae
- Tribe: Colobotheini
- Genus: Colobothea; Lepeletier & Audinet-Serville in Latreille, 1825

Species
- See text

= Colobothea =

Genus of beetles

Colobothea is a genus of longhorn beetles of the subfamily Lamiinae.

- Colobothea aleata Bates, 1885
- Colobothea amoena Gahan, 1889
- Colobothea andina Monné, 1993
- Colobothea appendiculata Aurivillius, 1902
- Colobothea assimilis Aurivillius, 1902
- Colobothea berkovi Monné & Monné, 2010
- Colobothea bicuspidata (Latreille, 1811)
- Colobothea biguttata Bates, 1865
- Colobothea bilineata Bates, 1865
- Colobothea bisignata Bates, 1865
- Colobothea bitincta Bates, 1872
- Colobothea boliviana Galileo et al., 2014
- Colobothea brullei Gahan, 1889
- Colobothea caramaschii Monné, 2005
- Colobothea carneola Bates, 1865
- Colobothea cassandra (Dalman, 1823)
- Colobothea centralis Monné, 1993
- Colobothea chemsaki Giesbert, 1979
- Colobothea chontalensis Bates, 1872
- Colobothea cincticornis (Schaller, 1783)
- Colobothea colombiana Monné, 1993
- Colobothea crassa Bates, 1865
- Colobothea decemmaculata Bates, 1865
- Colobothea declivis Aurivillius, 1902
- Colobothea delicata Monné, 2005
- Colobothea denotata Monné, 2005
- Colobothea destituta Bates, 1865
- Colobothea discicollis Gahan, 1889
- Colobothea dispersa Bates, 1872
- Colobothea distincta Pascoe, 1866
- Colobothea elongata Gahan, 1889
- Colobothea emarginata (Olivier, 1795)
- Colobothea erythrophthalma (Voet, 1806)
- Colobothea eximia Aurivillius, 1902
- Colobothea fasciata Bates, 1865
- Colobothea fasciatipennis Linsley, 1935
- Colobothea femorosa Erichson, 1847
- Colobothea fibrosa Erichson, 1847
- Colobothea flavimacula (Voet, 1806)
- Colobothea flavoguttata Aurivillius, 1902
- Colobothea flavomaculata Bates, 1865
- Colobothea forcipata Bates, 1865
- Colobothea geminata Bates, 1865
- Colobothea grisescens Zajciw, 1962
- Colobothea guatemalena Bates, 1881
- Colobothea guttulata Aurivillius, 1902
- Colobothea hebraica Bates, 1865
- Colobothea hirtipes (DeGeer, 1775)
- Colobothea hondurena Giesbert, 1979
- Colobothea humerosa Bates, 1865
- Colobothea juncea Bates, 1865
- Colobothea larriveei Galileo et al., 2014
- Colobothea lateralis Bates, 1865
- Colobothea leucophaea Bates, 1865
- Colobothea lineatocollis Bates, 1865
- Colobothea lucaria Bates, 1865
- Colobothea lunulata Lucas, 1859
- Colobothea macularis (Olivier, 1792)
- Colobothea maculicollis Bates, 1865
- Colobothea meleagrina Erichson, 1847
- Colobothea mimetica Aurivillius, 1902
- Colobothea mosaica Bates, 1865
- Colobothea musiva (Germar, 1824)
- Colobothea naevia Bates, 1865
- Colobothea naevigera Bates, 1865
- Colobothea nigromaculata Zajciw, 1971
- Colobothea obconica Aurivillius, 1902
- Colobothea obtusa Bates, 1865
- Colobothea olivencia Bates, 1865
- Colobothea ordinata Bates, 1865
- Colobothea osculatii Guérin-Méneville, 1855
- Colobothea parcens Bates, 1881
- Colobothea passerina Erichson in Schomburg, 1848
- Colobothea paulina Bates, 1865
- Colobothea peruviana Aurivillius, 1920
- Colobothea pictilis Bates, 1865
- Colobothea picturata Monné, 1993
- Colobothea pimplaea Bates, 1865
- Colobothea plagiata Aurivillius, 1902
- Colobothea plebeja Aurivillius, 1902
- Colobothea pleuralis Casey, 1913
- Colobothea poecila (Germar, 1824)
- Colobothea propinqua Bates, 1865
- Colobothea pulchella Bates, 1865
- Colobothea punctata Aurivillius, 1902
- Colobothea pura Bates, 1865
- Colobothea ramosa Bates, 1872
- Colobothea regularis Bates, 1881
- Colobothea rincona Giesbert, 1979
- Colobothea roppai Monné, 1993
- Colobothea rubroornata Zajciw, 1962
- Colobothea sahlbergi Aurivillius, 1902
- Colobothea schmidti Bates, 1865
- Colobothea scolopacea Erichson, 1847
- Colobothea securifera Bates, 1865
- Colobothea sejuncta Bates, 1865
- Colobothea seminalis Bates, 1865
- Colobothea septemmaculata Zajciw, 1971
- Colobothea seriatomaculata Zajciw, 1962
- Colobothea sexagglomerata Zajciw, 1962
- Colobothea sexmaculata Aurivillius, 1902
- Colobothea sexualis Casey, 1913
- Colobothea signatipennis Lameere, 1884
- Colobothea signativentris Gahan, 1889
- Colobothea simillima Aurivillius, 1902
- Colobothea sinaloensis Giesbert, 1979
- Colobothea socia Gahan, 1889
- Colobothea sordida Aurivillius, 1902
- Colobothea strigosa Bates, 1865
- Colobothea styligera Bates, 1865
- Colobothea subcincta Laporte, 1840
- Colobothea sublunulata Zajciw, 1962
- Colobothea subtessellata Bates, 1865
- Colobothea unilineata Bates, 1872
- Colobothea varia (Fabricius, 1787)
- Colobothea varica Bates, 1865
- Colobothea vidua Bates, 1865
- Colobothea viehmanni Monné & Martins, 1979
- Colobothea wappesi Monné & Monné, 2010

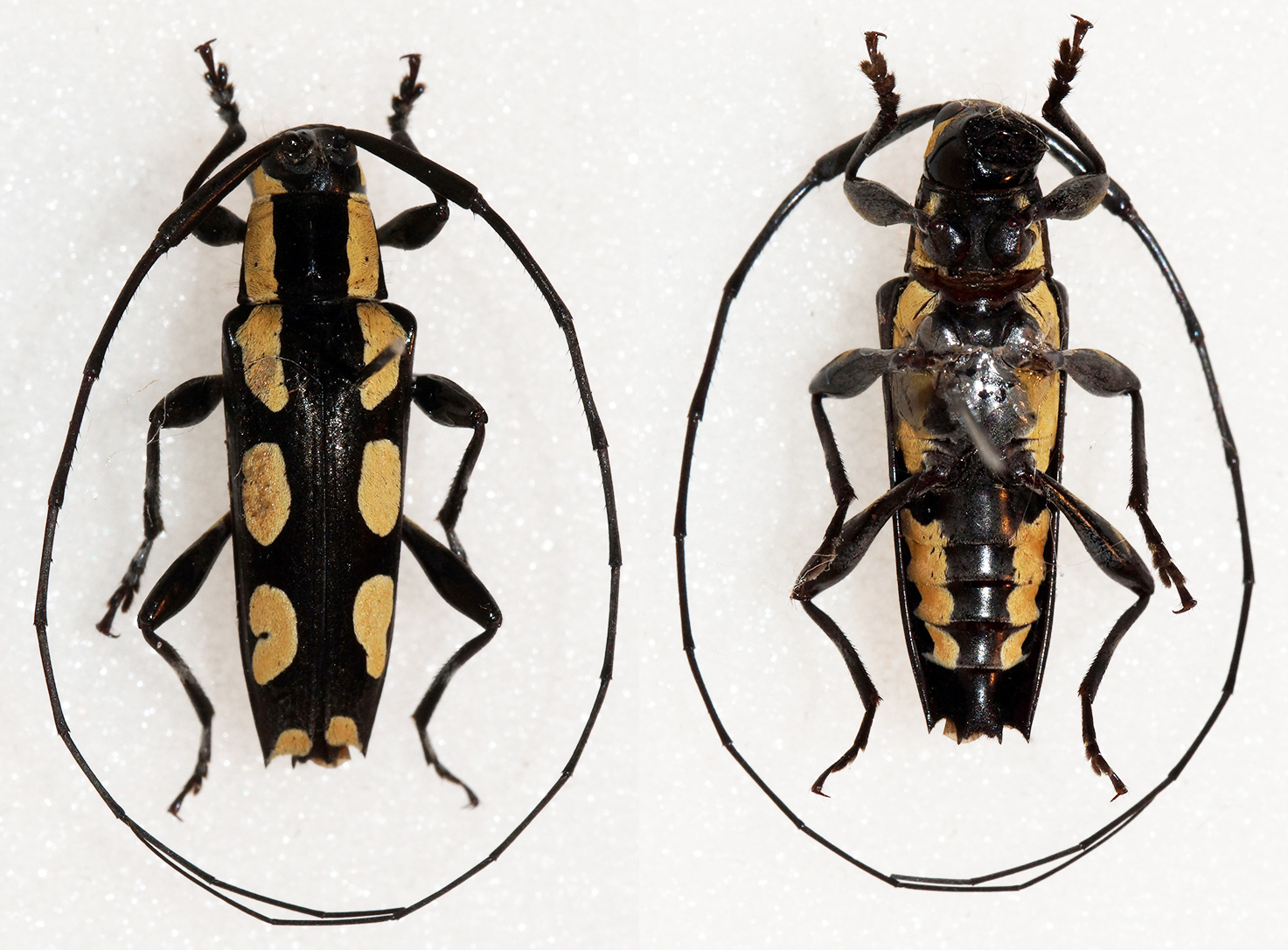
Colobothea cassandra
