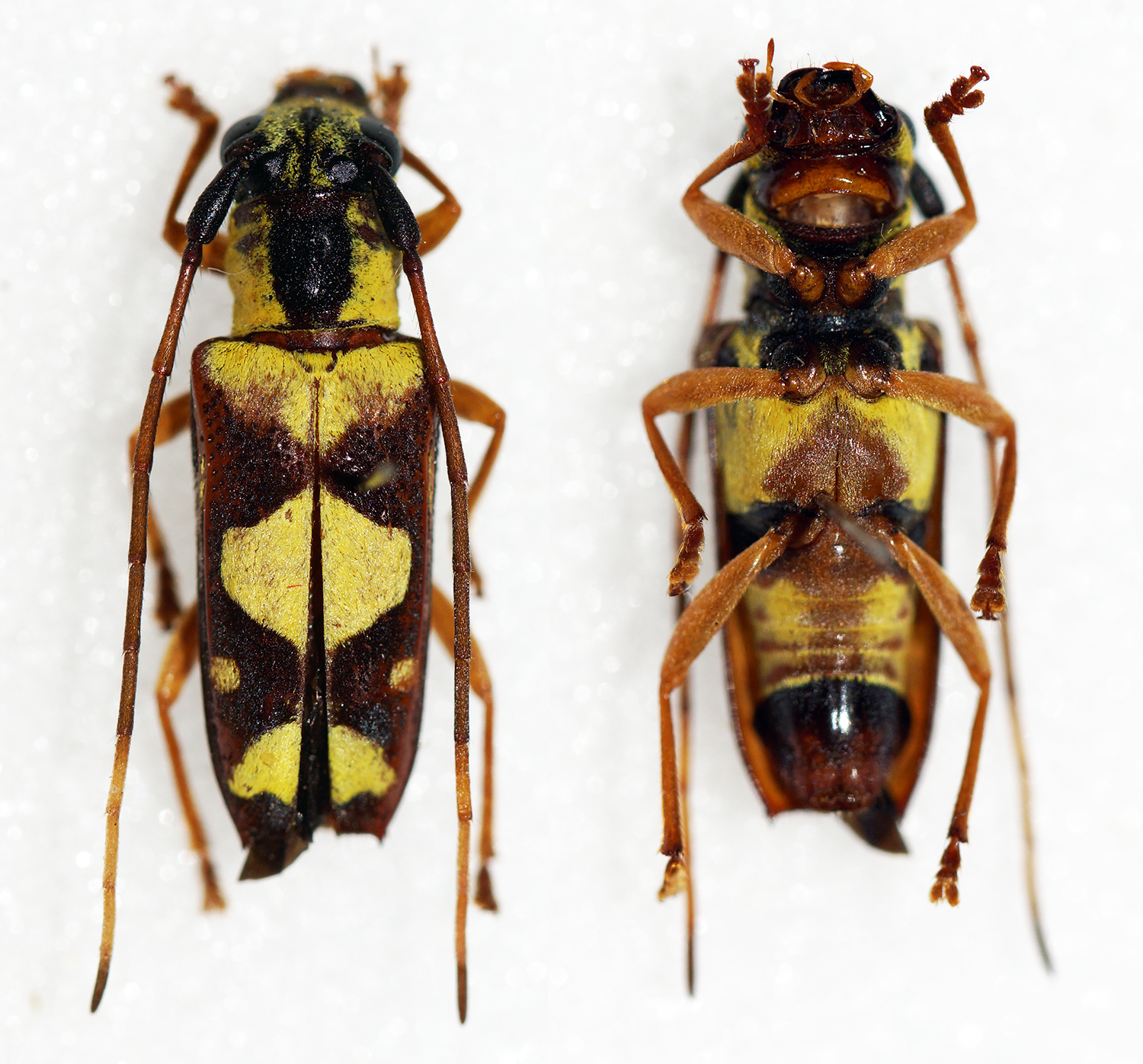

Scientific classification
- Kingdom: Animalia
- Phylum: Arthropoda
- Clade: Pancrustacea
- Class: Insecta
- Order: Coleoptera
- Suborder: Polyphaga
- Infraorder: Cucujiformia
- Family: Cerambycidae
- Genus: Glenea
- Species: G. pulchella

Binomial name
- Glenea pulchella Pascoe, 1858

Synonyms
- Glenea vesta Pascoe, 1866; Glenea vestalis Heller, 1934

= Glenea pulchella =

Species of beetle

Glenea pulchella is a species of beetle in the family Cerambycidae. It was described by Francis Polkinghorne Pascoe in 1858. It is known from Java, Malaysia, Sumatra, Borneo, Moluccas, and the Philippines.

== Varietas ==
- Glenea pulchella var. postmediopunctata Breuning, 1956
- Glenea pulchella var. preapiceconjuncta Breuning, 1956
- Glenea pulchella var. transversevittata Breuning, 1956
