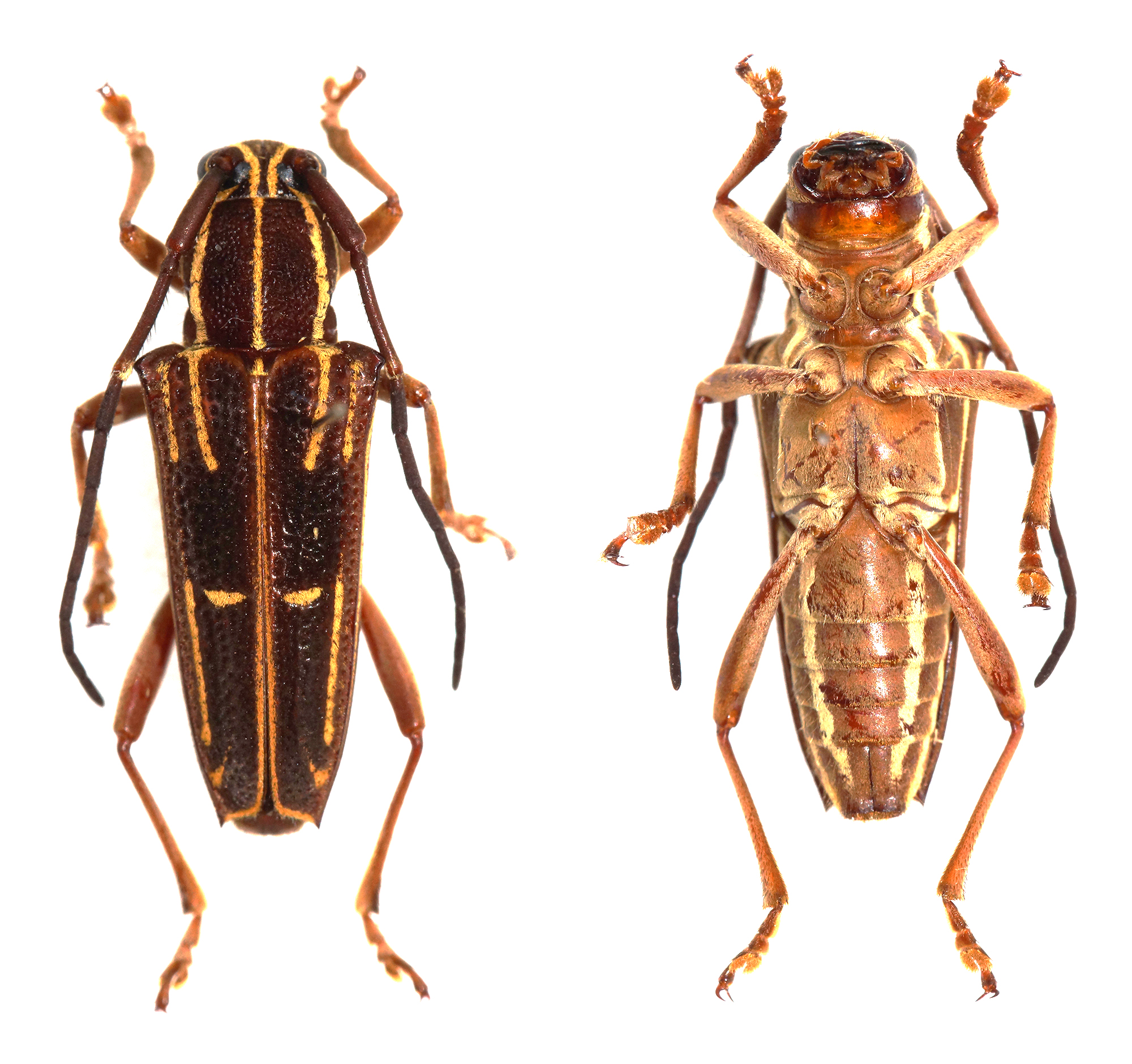

Scientific classification
- Kingdom: Animalia
- Phylum: Arthropoda
- Clade: Pancrustacea
- Class: Insecta
- Order: Coleoptera
- Suborder: Polyphaga
- Infraorder: Cucujiformia
- Family: Cerambycidae
- Genus: Glenea
- Species: G. extensa

Binomial name
- Glenea extensa Pascoe, 1858

= Glenea extensa =

Species of beetle

Glenea extensa is a species of beetle in the family Cerambycidae. It was described by Francis Polkinghorne Pascoe in 1858. It is known from Borneo and Malaysia.

== Varietas ==
- Glenea extensa var. bipunctulipennis Breuning, 1958
- Glenea extensa var. jubaea Pascoe, 1866
- Glenea extensa var. mima J. Thomson, 1865
