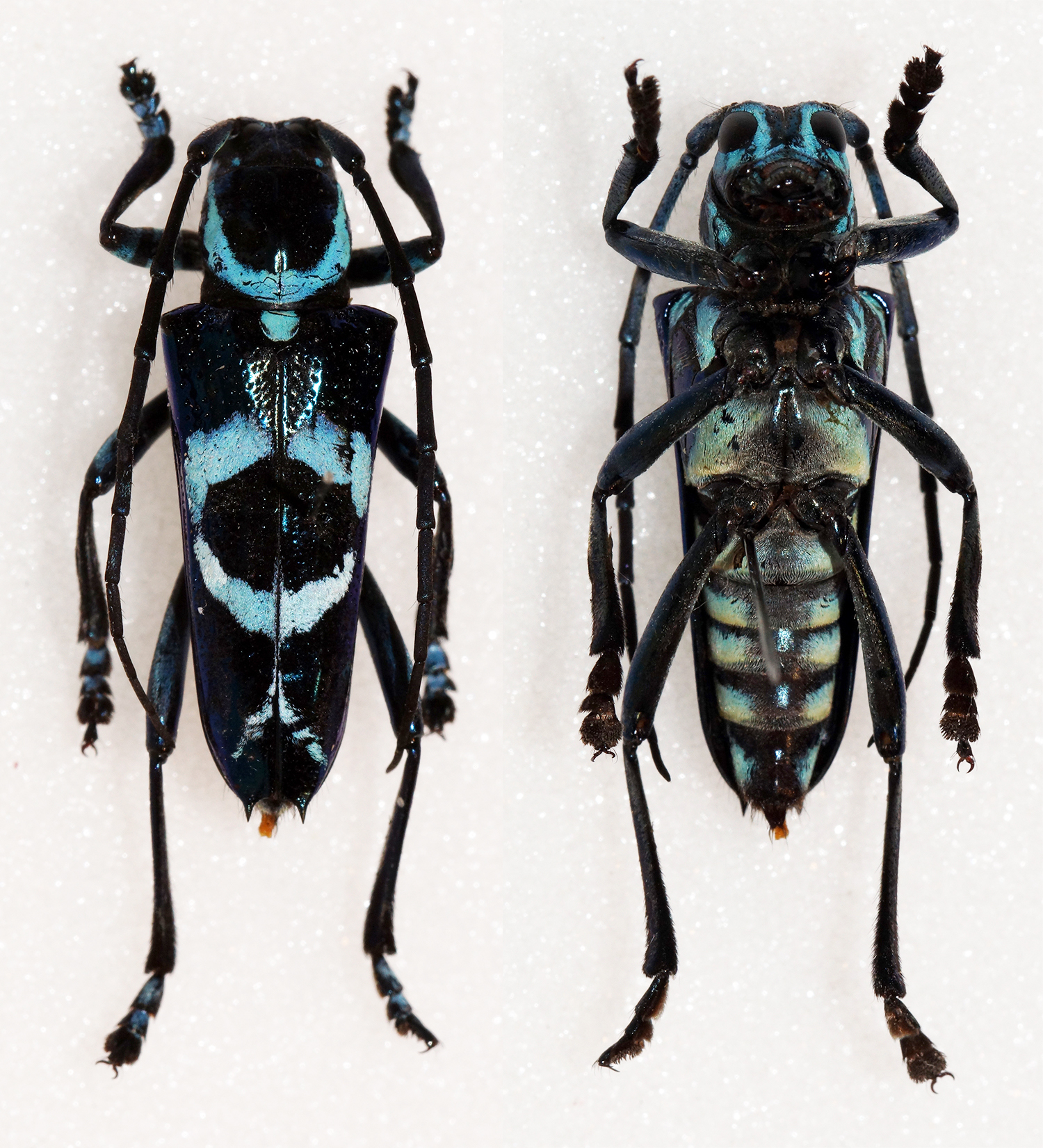

Scientific classification
- Kingdom: Animalia
- Phylum: Arthropoda
- Class: Insecta
- Order: Coleoptera
- Suborder: Polyphaga
- Infraorder: Cucujiformia
- Family: Cerambycidae
- Genus: Glenea
- Species: G. thomsoni

Binomial name
- Glenea thomsoni Pascoe, 1867

= Glenea thomsoni =

Species of beetle

Glenea thomsoni is a species of beetle in the family Cerambycidae. It was described by Francis Polkinghorne Pascoe in 1867. It is known from Moluccas.

== Varietas ==
- Glenea thomsoni var. apiceinvittata Breuning, 1956
- Glenea thomsoni var. lunulofasciata Pic, 1943
- Glenea thomsoni var. ochreocirculata Breuning, 1956
