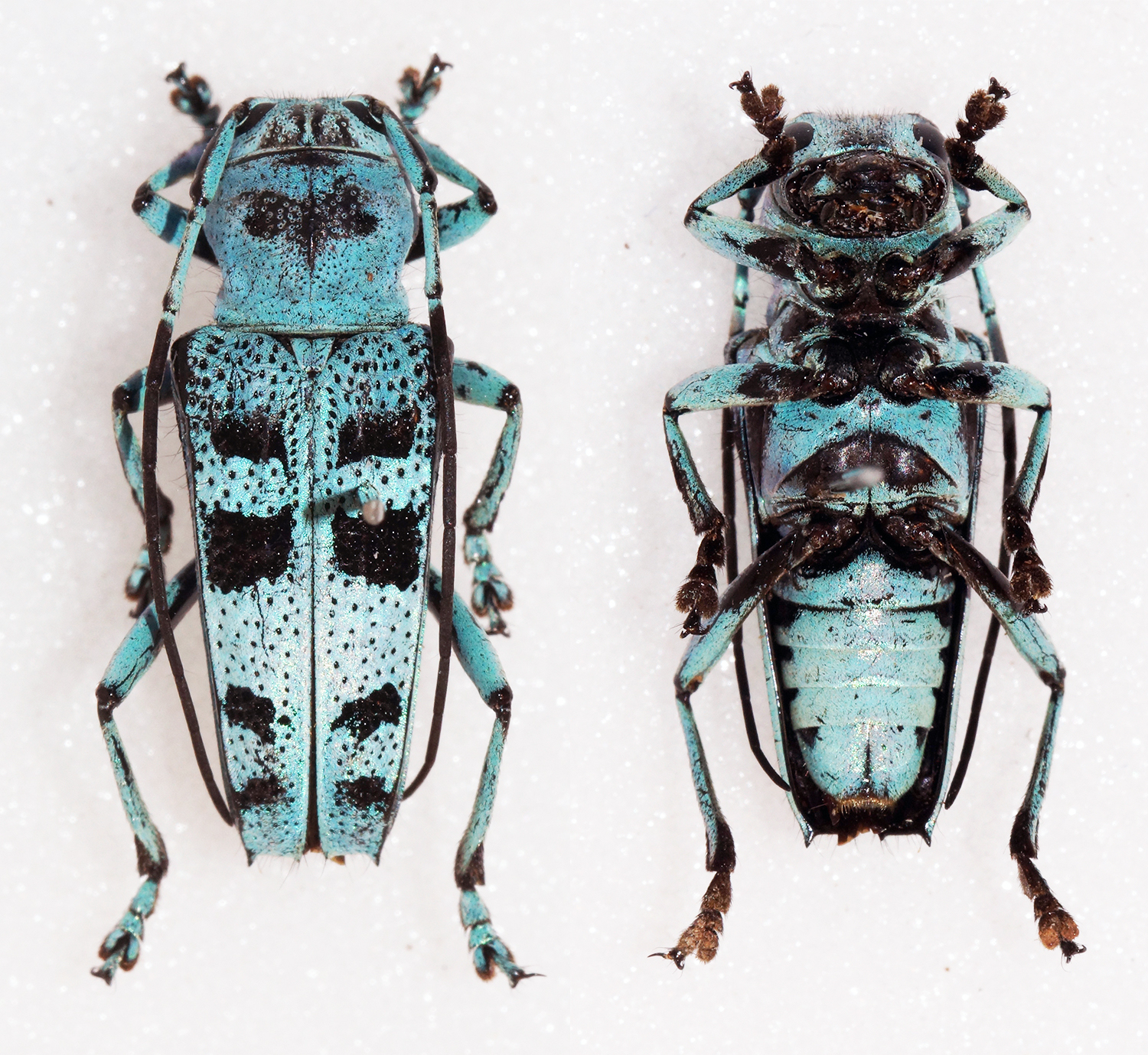

Scientific classification
- Kingdom: Animalia
- Phylum: Arthropoda
- Clade: Pancrustacea
- Class: Insecta
- Order: Coleoptera
- Suborder: Polyphaga
- Infraorder: Cucujiformia
- Family: Cerambycidae
- Genus: Glenea
- Species: G. celia

Binomial name
- Glenea celia Pascoe, 1888

Synonyms
- Glenea cyanescens Pic, 1947

= Glenea celia =

Species of beetle

Glenea celia is a species of beetle in the family Cerambycidae. It was described by Francis Polkinghorne Pascoe in 1888. It is known from Sumatra, Java, Borneo and Malaysia. It contains the varietas Glenea celia var. bipuncticollis.
