= Glenea porphyrio =

Scientific classification
- Kingdom: Animalia
- Phylum: Arthropoda
- Clade: Pancrustacea
- Class: Insecta
- Order: Coleoptera
- Suborder: Polyphaga
- Infraorder: Cucujiformia
- Family: Cerambycidae
- Genus: Glenea
- Species: G. porphyrio

Binomial name
- Glenea porphyrio Pascoe, 1866

Species of beetle

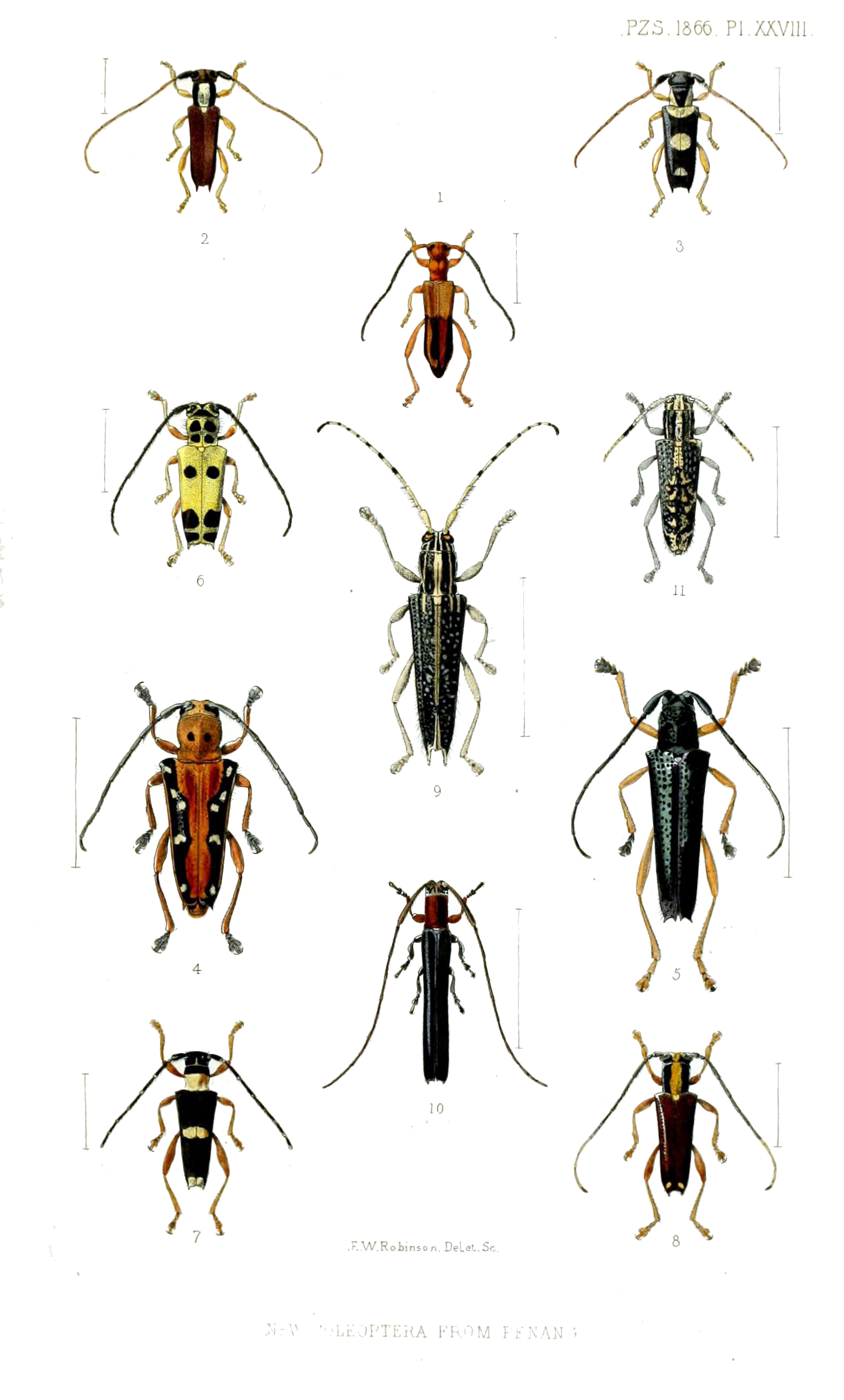
An illustration plate depicting flat-faced longhorn beetles from Penang, including species related to Glenea porphyrio

Glenea porphyrio is a species of beetle in the family Cerambycidae. It was described by Francis Polkinghorne Pascoe in 1866. It is known from Borneo and Malaysia.
