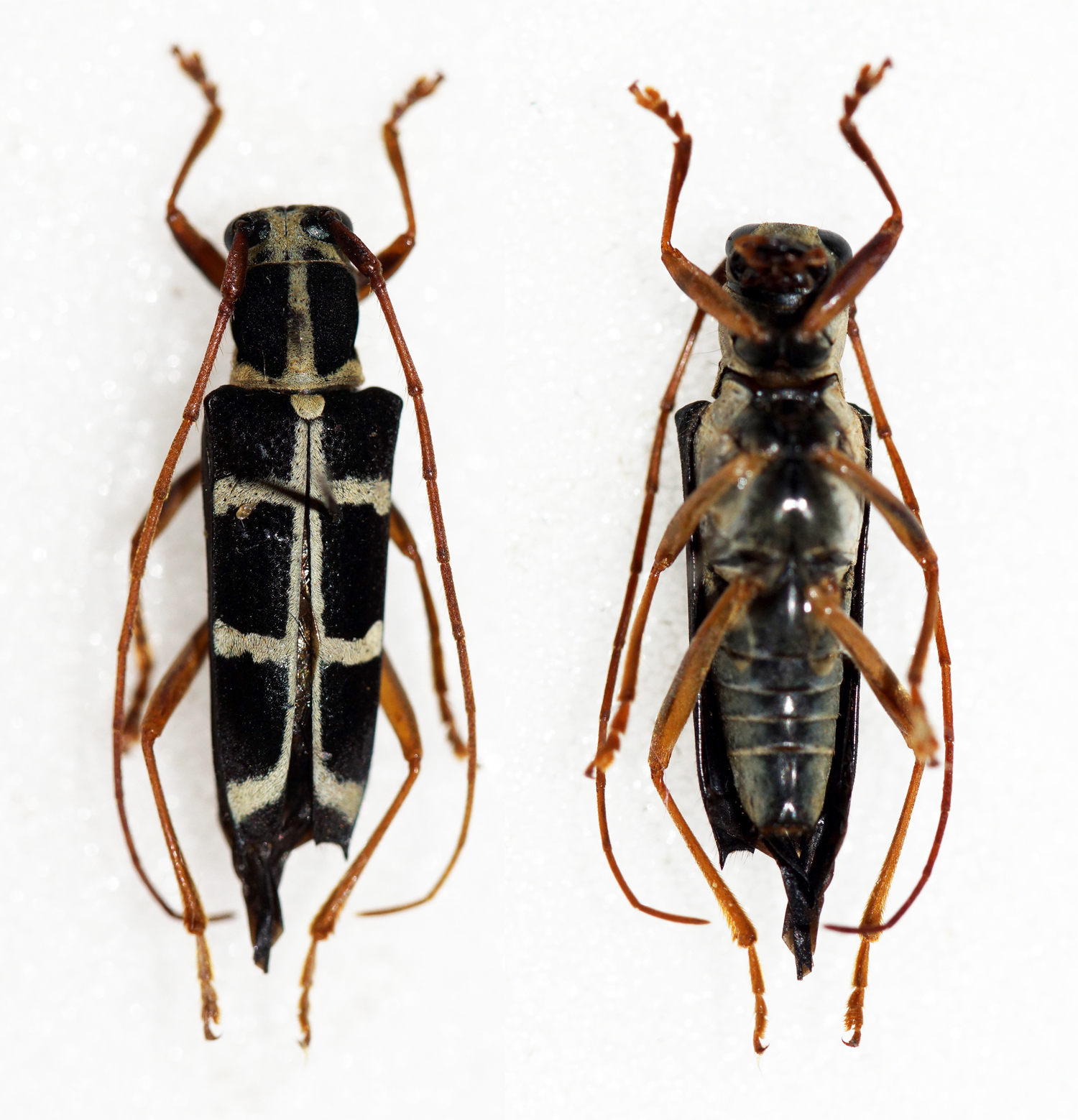

Scientific classification
- Domain: Eukaryota
- Kingdom: Animalia
- Phylum: Arthropoda
- Class: Insecta
- Order: Coleoptera
- Suborder: Polyphaga
- Infraorder: Cucujiformia
- Family: Cerambycidae
- Genus: Glenea
- Species: G. helleri

Binomial name
- Glenea helleri Aurivillius, 1923

Synonyms
- Glenea scalaris Heller, 1921 nec Thomson, 1865

= Glenea helleri =

Species of beetle

Glenea helleri is a species of beetle in the family Cerambycidae. It was described by Per Olof Christopher Aurivillius in 1923 and is known from the Philippines.
