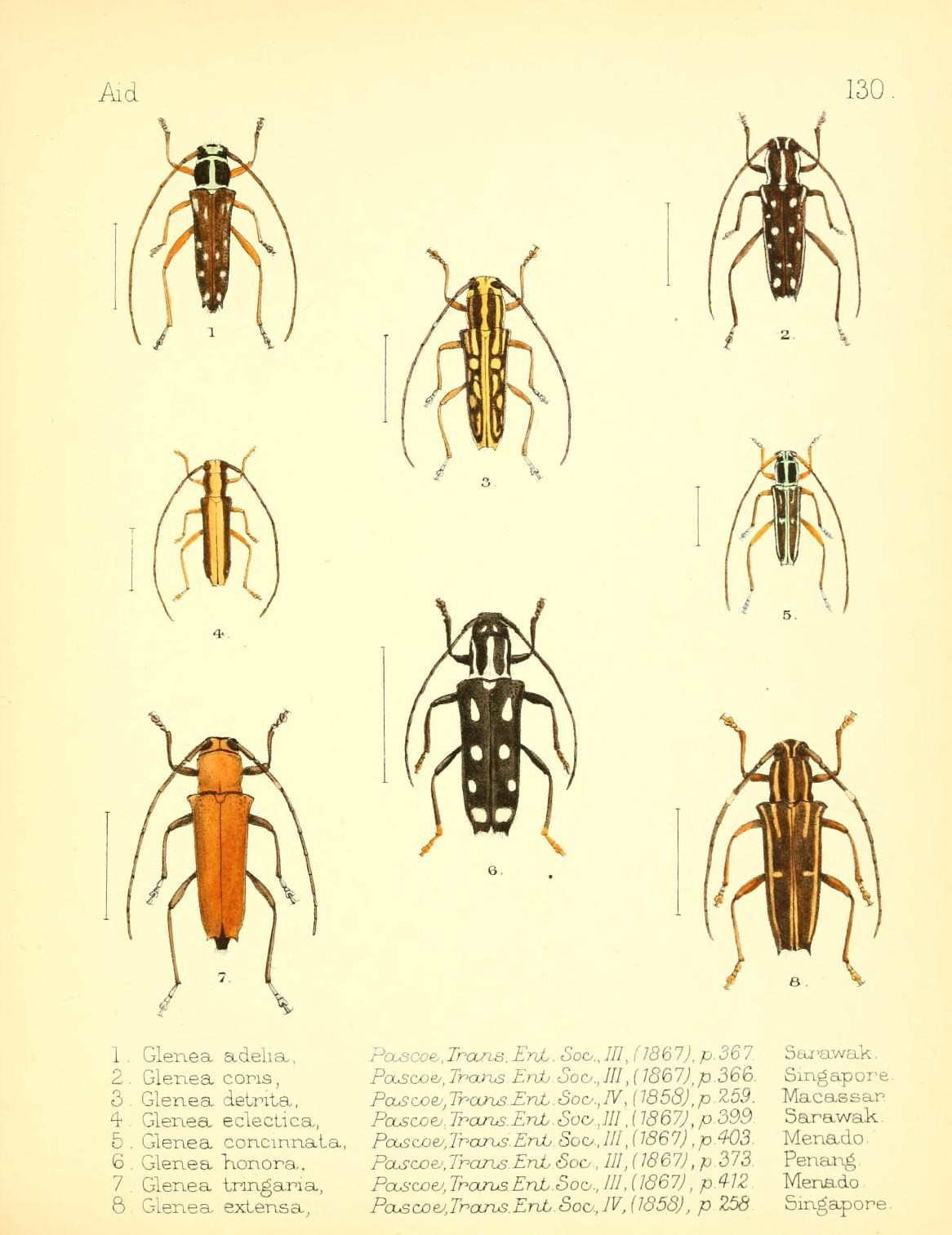
- 2 . Glenea coris

Scientific classification
- Kingdom: Animalia
- Phylum: Arthropoda
- Clade: Pancrustacea
- Class: Insecta
- Order: Coleoptera
- Suborder: Polyphaga
- Infraorder: Cucujiformia
- Family: Cerambycidae
- Genus: Glenea
- Species: G. coris

Binomial name
- Glenea coris Pascoe, 1867

= Glenea coris =

Species of beetle

Glenea coris is a species of beetle in the family Cerambycidae. It was described by Francis Polkinghorne Pascoe in 1867.

== Subspecies ==
- Glenea coris coris Pascoe, 1867
- Glenea coris longitarsis Schwarzer, 1930
