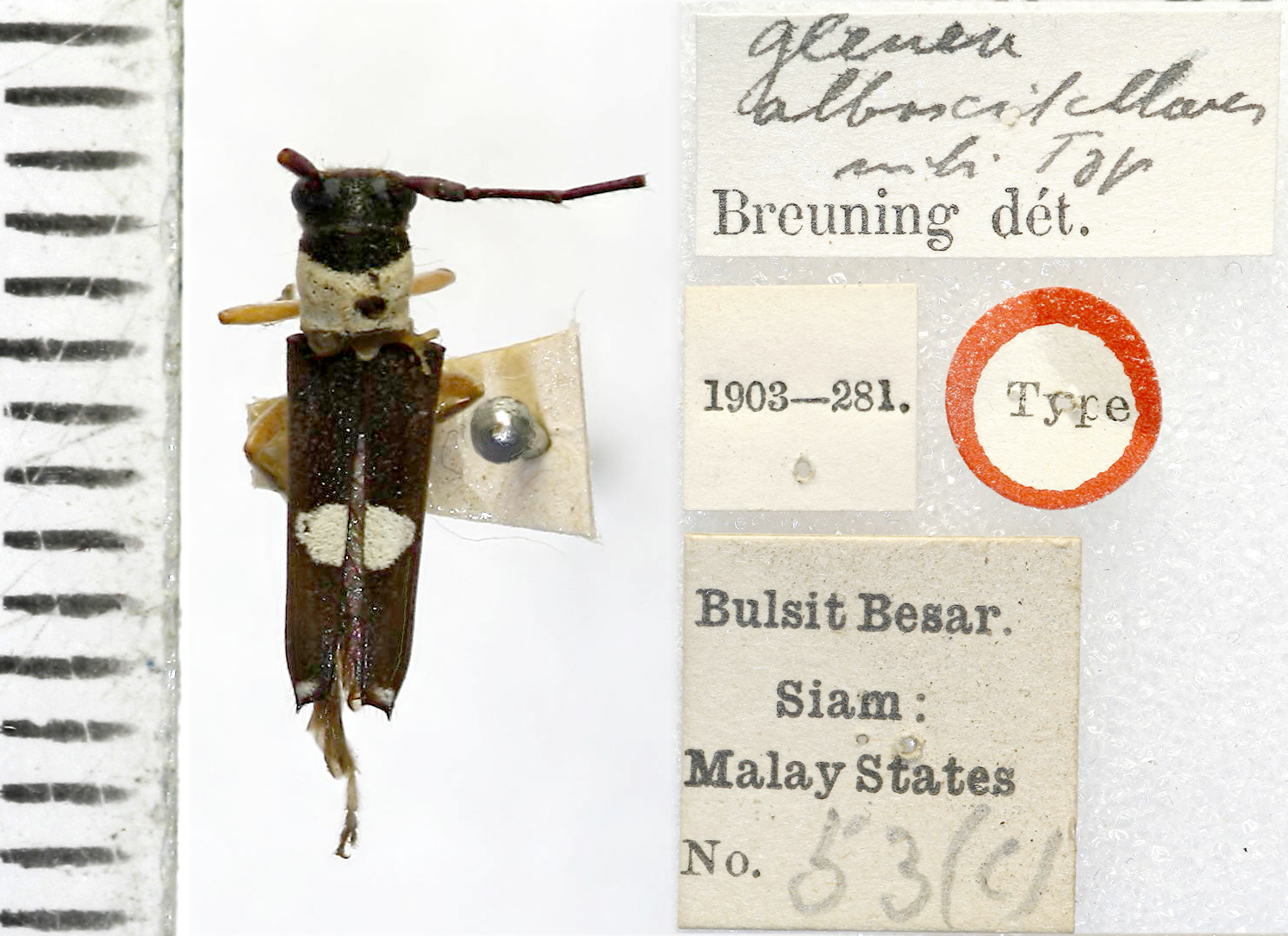
- Glenea alboscutellaris

Scientific classification
- Kingdom: Animalia
- Phylum: Arthropoda
- Class: Insecta
- Order: Coleoptera
- Suborder: Polyphaga
- Infraorder: Cucujiformia
- Family: Cerambycidae
- Genus: Glenea
- Species: G. alboscutellaris

Binomial name
- Glenea alboscutellaris Breuning, 1958

= Glenea alboscutellaris =

Species of beetle

Glenea alboscutellaris is a species of beetle in the family Cerambycidae. It was described by Stephan von Breuning in 1958. It is known from Thailand.
