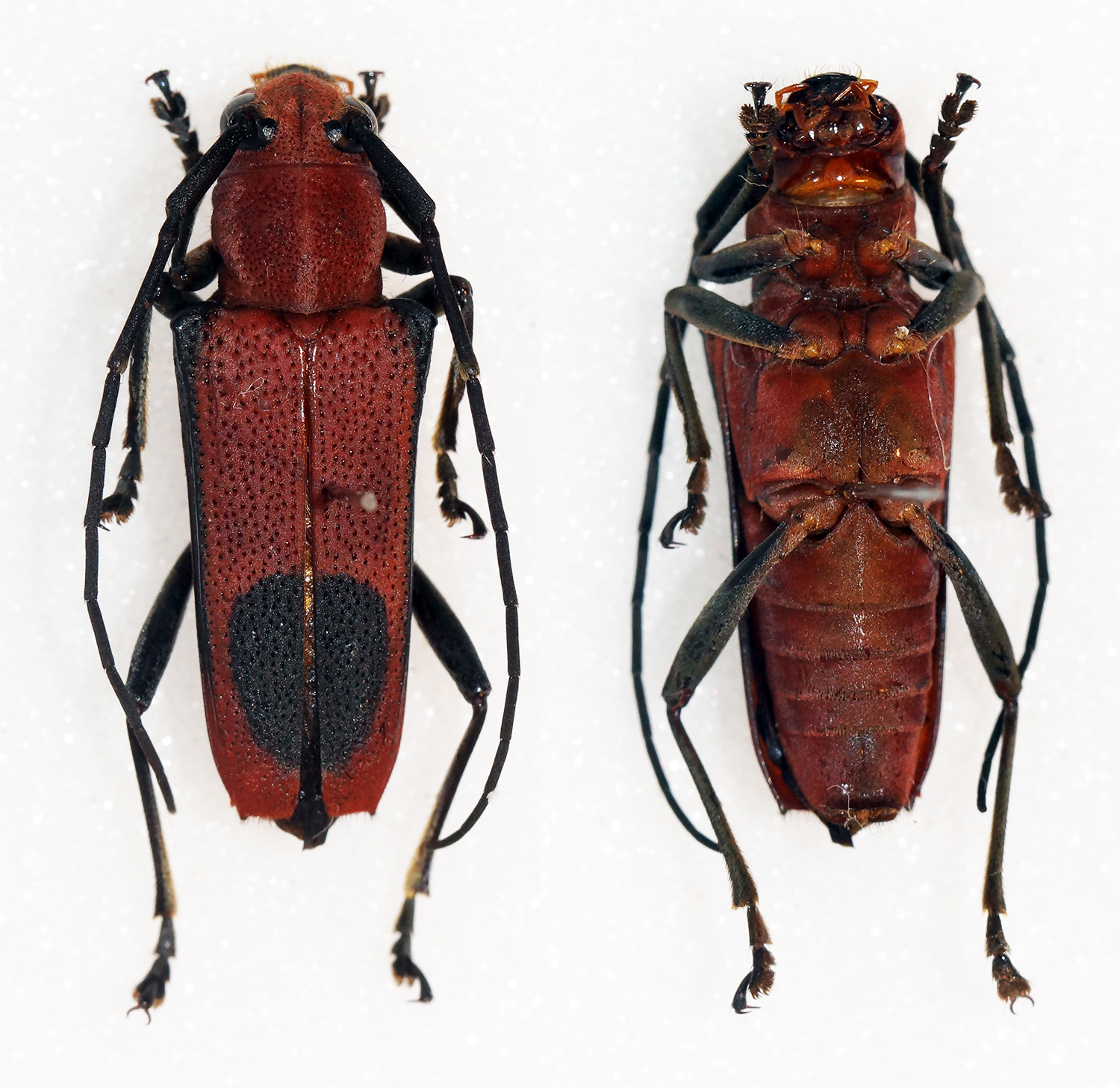

Scientific classification
- Domain: Eukaryota
- Kingdom: Animalia
- Phylum: Arthropoda
- Class: Insecta
- Order: Coleoptera
- Suborder: Polyphaga
- Infraorder: Cucujiformia
- Family: Cerambycidae
- Genus: Glenea
- Species: G. dimorpha

Binomial name
- Glenea dimorpha Vives, 2005

= Glenea dimorpha =

Species of beetle

Glenea dimorpha is a species of beetle in the family Cerambycidae. It was described by Vives in 2005. It is found in Vietnam.
