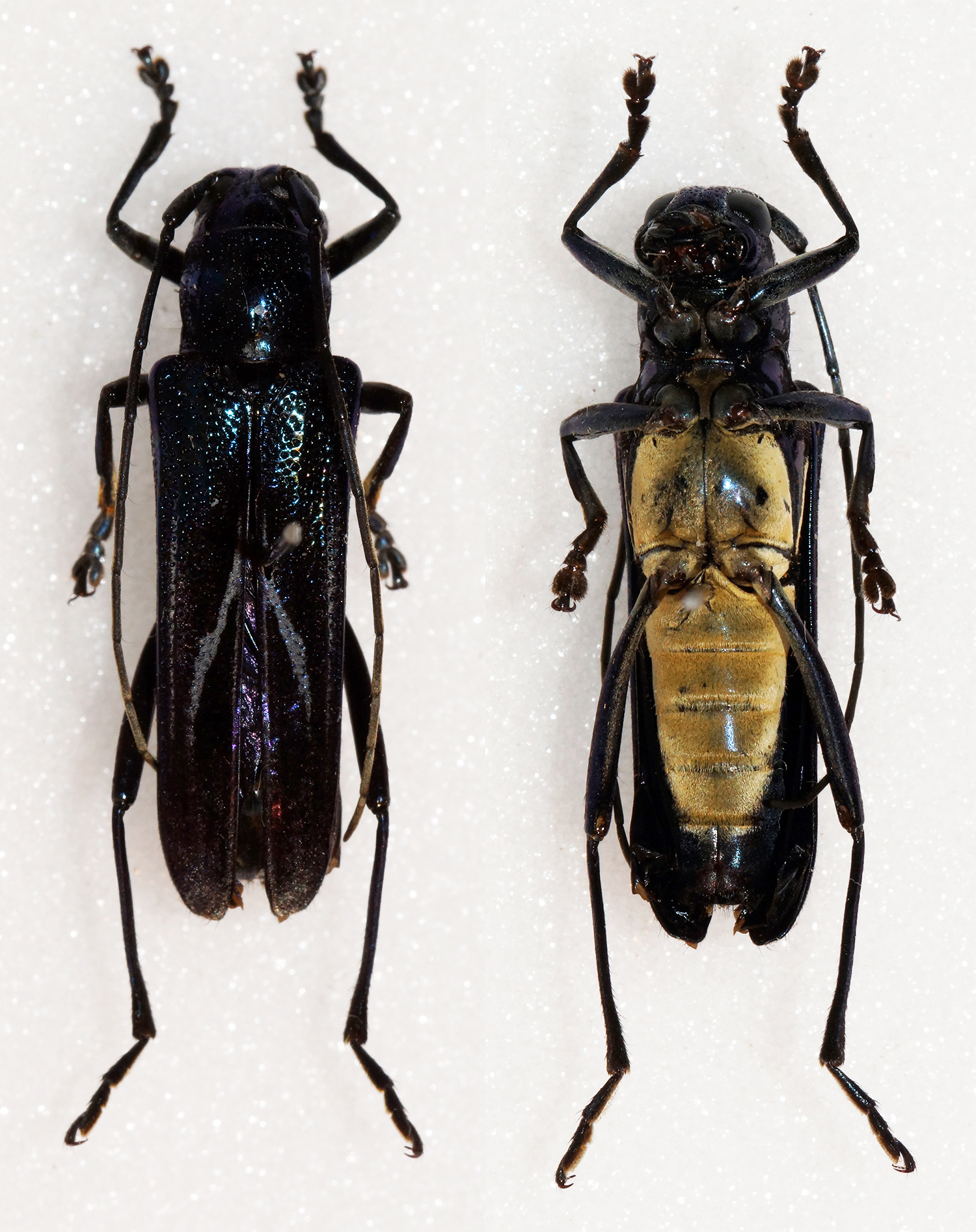

Scientific classification
- Domain: Eukaryota
- Kingdom: Animalia
- Phylum: Arthropoda
- Class: Insecta
- Order: Coleoptera
- Suborder: Polyphaga
- Infraorder: Cucujiformia
- Family: Cerambycidae
- Genus: Glenea
- Species: G. apicepurpurata

Binomial name
- Glenea apicepurpurata Hüdepohl, 1990

= Glenea apicepurpurata =

Species of beetle

Glenea apicepurpurata is a species of beetle in the family Cerambycidae. It was described by Karl-Ernst Hüdepohl in 1990.
