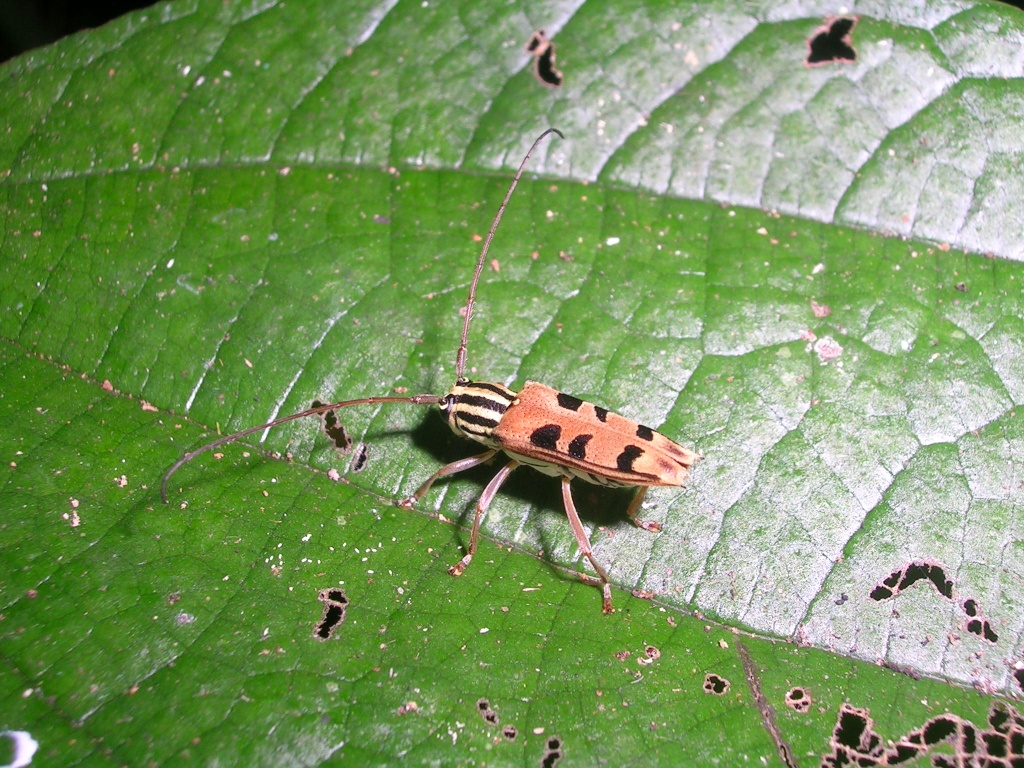
- From Kerala

Scientific classification
- Kingdom: Animalia
- Phylum: Arthropoda
- Class: Insecta
- Order: Coleoptera
- Suborder: Polyphaga
- Infraorder: Cucujiformia
- Family: Cerambycidae
- Genus: Glenea
- Species: G. sexnotata

Binomial name
- Glenea sexnotata Gahan, 1889

= Glenea sexnotata =

Species of beetle

Glenea sexnotata is a species of long-horned beetle found in the Western Ghats of India.
