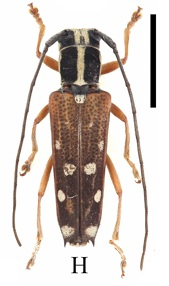
- Glenea relicta relicta

Scientific classification
- Kingdom: Animalia
- Phylum: Arthropoda
- Class: Insecta
- Order: Coleoptera
- Suborder: Polyphaga
- Infraorder: Cucujiformia
- Family: Cerambycidae
- Genus: Glenea
- Species: G. relicta

Binomial name
- Glenea relicta Pascoe, 1868

Synonyms
- Glenea relicta v. unilineata Pic, 1943; Glenea (Glenea) relicta m. discobasireducta Breuning, 1956; Glenea (Glenea) relicta m. posthumerolineata Breuning, 1956; Glenea relicta m. obscurefemorata Breuning, 1965

= Glenea relicta =

Species of beetle

Glenea relicta is a species of beetle in the family Cerambycidae. It was described by Francis Polkinghorne Pascoe in 1868. This species is found in China, Japan, Taiwan, Vietnam, India and Korea.

== Subspecies ==
- Glenea relicta relicta (China [Sichuan, Hubei, Jiangxi, Zhejiang, Jiangsu, Anhui, Shaanxi, Guizhou, Hunan, Fujian, Guangxi, Hainan, Guangdong], Vietnam, India, South Korea)
- Glenea relicta izuinsularis Fujita, 1980 (China [Hunan], Japan [Izu Islands])
- Glenea relicta formosensis Breuning, 1960 (Taiwan, Korea, Japan)
