= Glenea glaucescens =

Scientific classification
- Kingdom: Animalia
- Phylum: Arthropoda
- Clade: Pancrustacea
- Class: Insecta
- Order: Coleoptera
- Suborder: Polyphaga
- Infraorder: Cucujiformia
- Family: Cerambycidae
- Genus: Glenea
- Species: G. glaucescens

Binomial name
- Glenea glaucescens Aurivillius, 1903

Species of beetle

Glenea glaucescens is a species of beetle in the family Cerambycidae. It was described by Per Olof Christopher Aurivillius in 1903 and is known from Sulawesi.

== Varieties ==
- Glenea glaucescens var. flavicans Breuning, 1958
- Glenea glaucescens var. flavithorax Breuning, 1958
- Glenea glaucescens var. glaucans Breuning, 1958
- Glenea glaucescens var. olivescens Breuning, 1958
- Glenea glaucescens var. partealbescens Breuning, 1958
- Glenea glaucescens var. stramentosus Breuning, 1958
