= Glenea acuta =

Scientific classification
- Kingdom: Animalia
- Phylum: Arthropoda
- Clade: Pancrustacea
- Class: Insecta
- Order: Coleoptera
- Suborder: Polyphaga
- Infraorder: Cucujiformia
- Family: Cerambycidae
- Genus: Glenea
- Species: G. acuta

Binomial name
- Glenea acuta (Fabricius, 1801)

Synonyms
- Glenea ochracea Gahan, 1897; Saperda acuta Fabricius, 1801; Saperda miles Newman, 1838; Stibara ana Thomson, 1857; Stibara sanguinaria Thomson, 1857

Species of beetle

Glenea acuta is a species of beetle in the family Cerambycidae. It was described by Johan Christian Fabricius in 1801. It is known from Sumatra and Java.

== Subspecies ==
- Glenea acuta acuta (Fabricius, 1801)
- Glenea acuta montana Jordan, 1894
