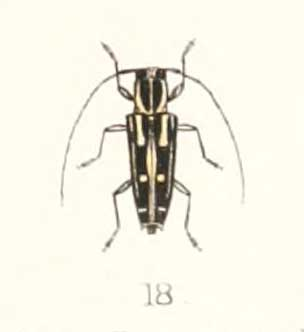

Scientific classification
- Domain: Eukaryota
- Kingdom: Animalia
- Phylum: Arthropoda
- Class: Insecta
- Order: Coleoptera
- Suborder: Polyphaga
- Infraorder: Cucujiformia
- Family: Cerambycidae
- Genus: Glenea
- Species: G. ossifera

Binomial name
- Glenea ossifera Jordan, 1894

Synonyms
- Glenea atra Jordan, 1894

= Glenea ossifera =

Species of beetle

Glenea ossifera is a species of beetle in the family Cerambycidae. It was described by Karl Jordan in 1894.
