= Glenea pseudoscalaris =

Scientific classification
- Kingdom: Animalia
- Phylum: Arthropoda
- Class: Insecta
- Order: Coleoptera
- Suborder: Polyphaga
- Infraorder: Cucujiformia
- Family: Cerambycidae
- Genus: Glenea
- Species: G. pseudoscalaris

Binomial name
- Glenea pseudoscalaris (Fairmaire, 1895)

Synonyms
- Glenea miwai monticola Gressitt, 1951; Saperda pseudoscalaris Fairmaire, 1895

Species of beetle

Glenea pseudoscalaris is a species of beetle in the family Cerambycidae. It was described by Léon Fairmaire in 1895. The species is found in Vietnam, China and Taiwan.

== Subspecies ==
- Glenea pseudoscalaris miwai Mitono, 1943
- Glenea pseudoscalaris pseudoscalaris (Fairmaire, 1895)
