= Glenea annulicornis =

Scientific classification
- Kingdom: Animalia
- Phylum: Arthropoda
- Class: Insecta
- Order: Coleoptera
- Suborder: Polyphaga
- Infraorder: Cucujiformia
- Family: Cerambycidae
- Genus: Glenea
- Species: G. annulicornis

Binomial name
- Glenea annulicornis Schwarzer, 1925

Synonyms
- Glenea annulicornis Schwarzer, 1925; Glenea (Macroglenea) niijimai Matsushita, 1938; Glenea (Macroglenea) annulicornis Gressitt, 1951; Glenea (Glenea) annulicornis Breuning, 1966; Glenea (Glenea) annulicornia Nara, 2002

Species of beetle

Glenea annulicornis is a species of beetle in the family Cerambycidae. It was described by Bernhard Schwarzer in 1925.
