= Glenea exculta =

Scientific classification
- Domain: Eukaryota
- Kingdom: Animalia
- Phylum: Arthropoda
- Class: Insecta
- Order: Coleoptera
- Suborder: Polyphaga
- Infraorder: Cucujiformia
- Family: Cerambycidae
- Genus: Glenea
- Species: G. exculta

Binomial name
- Glenea exculta Newman, 1842

Species of beetle

Glenea exculta is a species of beetle in the family Cerambycidae. It was described by Newman in 1842.

== Subspecies ==
- Glenea exculta exculta Newman, 1842
- Glenea exculta gracilis Aurivillius, 1924
- Glenea exculta latefasciaticollis Breuning, 1956
- Glenea exculta lineella Thomson, 1865
- Glenea exculta medioconfluens Breuning, 1956
