= Glenea despecta =

Scientific classification
- Kingdom: Animalia
- Phylum: Arthropoda
- Clade: Pancrustacea
- Class: Insecta
- Order: Coleoptera
- Suborder: Polyphaga
- Infraorder: Cucujiformia
- Family: Cerambycidae
- Genus: Glenea
- Species: G. despecta

Binomial name
- Glenea despecta Pascoe, 1858

Synonyms
- Glenea albitarsis Pic, 1943; Glenea guttigera J. Thomson, 1856; Glenea lumulumensis Fisher, 1935; Glenea sophia J. Thomson, 1879

Species of beetle

Glenea despecta is a species of beetle in the family Cerambycidae. It was described by Francis Polkinghorne Pascoe in 1858. It is known from Sumatra, Borneo and Vietnam.
