= Glenea pseudogiraffa =

Scientific classification
- Kingdom: Animalia
- Phylum: Arthropoda
- Class: Insecta
- Order: Coleoptera
- Suborder: Polyphaga
- Infraorder: Cucujiformia
- Family: Cerambycidae
- Genus: Glenea
- Species: G. pseudogiraffa

Binomial name
- Glenea pseudogiraffa Báguena & Breuning, 1958

Species of beetle

Glenea pseudogiraffa is a species of beetle in the family Cerambycidae. It was described by Báguena and Stephan von Breuning in 1958.

== Subspecies ==
- Glenea pseudogiraffa pseudogiraffa Báguena & Breuning, 1958
- Glenea pseudogiraffa taverniersi Breuning, 1974
