= Glenea tritoleuca =

Scientific classification
- Domain: Eukaryota
- Kingdom: Animalia
- Phylum: Arthropoda
- Class: Insecta
- Order: Coleoptera
- Suborder: Polyphaga
- Infraorder: Cucujiformia
- Family: Cerambycidae
- Genus: Glenea
- Species: G. tritoleuca

Binomial name
- Glenea tritoleuca Aurivillius, 1924

Species of beetle

Glenea tritoleuca is a species of beetle in the family Cerambycidae. It was described by Per Olof Christopher Aurivillius in 1924.

== Subspecies ==
- Glenea tritoleuca tritoleuca Aurivillius, 1924
- Glenea tritoleuca uniluteofasciata Pic, 1943
