= Glenea lambii =

Scientific classification
- Domain: Eukaryota
- Kingdom: Animalia
- Phylum: Arthropoda
- Class: Insecta
- Order: Coleoptera
- Suborder: Polyphaga
- Infraorder: Cucujiformia
- Family: Cerambycidae
- Genus: Glenea
- Species: G. lambii

Binomial name
- Glenea lambii (Pascoe, 1866)

Synonyms
- Tanylecta lambii Pascoe, 1866; Glenea lambi (Pascoe) Breuning, 1954

Species of beetle

Glenea lambii is a species of beetle in the family Cerambycidae. It was described by Francis Polkinghorne Pascoe in 1866, originally under the genus Tanylecta. It is found in Malaysia.
