= Glenea iphia =

Scientific classification
- Kingdom: Animalia
- Phylum: Arthropoda
- Clade: Pancrustacea
- Class: Insecta
- Order: Coleoptera
- Suborder: Polyphaga
- Infraorder: Cucujiformia
- Family: Cerambycidae
- Genus: Glenea
- Species: G. iphia

Binomial name
- Glenea iphia Pascoe, 1867

Species of beetle

Glenea iphia is a species of beetle in the family Cerambycidae. It was described by Francis Polkinghorne Pascoe in 1867. It is known from Sulawesi.

== Varietas ==
- Glenea iphia var. celebiana Breuning, 1960
- Glenea iphia var. inframetallica Breuning, 1958
