= Glenea venusta =

Scientific classification
- Kingdom: Animalia
- Phylum: Arthropoda
- Clade: Pancrustacea
- Class: Insecta
- Order: Coleoptera
- Suborder: Polyphaga
- Infraorder: Cucujiformia
- Family: Cerambycidae
- Genus: Glenea
- Species: G. venusta

Binomial name
- Glenea venusta (Guérin-Méneville, 1831)

Species of beetle

Glenea venusta is a species of beetle in the family Cerambycidae. It was described by Félix Édouard Guérin-Méneville in 1831.

== Subspecies ==
- Glenea venusta malaitai Breuning, 1978
- Glenea venusta venusta (Guérin-Méneville, 1831)
