= Glenea peregoi =

Scientific classification
- Kingdom: Animalia
- Phylum: Arthropoda
- Class: Insecta
- Order: Coleoptera
- Suborder: Polyphaga
- Infraorder: Cucujiformia
- Family: Cerambycidae
- Genus: Glenea
- Species: G. peregoi

Binomial name
- Glenea peregoi Breuning, 1949

Species of beetle

Glenea peregoi is a species of beetle in the family Cerambycidae. It was described by Stephan von Breuning in 1949.

== Subspecies ==
- Glenea peregoi peregoi Breuning, 1949
- Glenea peregoi subinterrupt Breuning, 1956
- Glenea peregoi sumatrensis Breuning, 1976
