= Glenea pici =

Scientific classification
- Domain: Eukaryota
- Kingdom: Animalia
- Phylum: Arthropoda
- Class: Insecta
- Order: Coleoptera
- Suborder: Polyphaga
- Infraorder: Cucujiformia
- Family: Cerambycidae
- Genus: Glenea
- Species: G. pici

Binomial name
- Glenea pici Aurivillius, 1925

Species of beetle

Glenea pici is a species of beetle in the family Cerambycidae. It was described by Per Olof Christopher Aurivillius in 1925. It is known from Vietnam, India and Laos.

== Subspecies ==
- Glenea pici pici Aurivillius, 1925
- Glenea pici schmidi Breuning, 1967
