= Glenea decemguttata =

Scientific classification
- Domain: Eukaryota
- Kingdom: Animalia
- Phylum: Arthropoda
- Class: Insecta
- Order: Coleoptera
- Suborder: Polyphaga
- Infraorder: Cucujiformia
- Family: Cerambycidae
- Genus: Glenea
- Species: G. decemguttata

Binomial name
- Glenea decemguttata Aurivillius, 1920

Synonyms
- Glenea suavis m. decemguttata (Aurivillius) Breuning, 1956

Species of beetle

Glenea decemguttata is a species of beetle in the family Cerambycidae. It was described by Per Olof Christopher Aurivillius in 1920 and is known from the Philippines.
