= Glenea tenuilineata =

Scientific classification
- Kingdom: Animalia
- Phylum: Arthropoda
- Class: Insecta
- Order: Coleoptera
- Suborder: Polyphaga
- Infraorder: Cucujiformia
- Family: Cerambycidae
- Genus: Glenea
- Species: G. tenuilineata

Binomial name
- Glenea tenuilineata Breuning, 1956

Species of beetle

Glenea tenuilineata is a species of beetle in the family Cerambycidae. It was described by Stephan von Breuning in 1956.

== Subspecies ==
- Glenea tenuilineata laterigriseicollis Breuning, 1956
- Glenea tenuilineata tenuilineata Breuning, 1956
