= Glenea masakii =

Scientific classification
- Domain: Eukaryota
- Kingdom: Animalia
- Phylum: Arthropoda
- Class: Insecta
- Order: Coleoptera
- Suborder: Polyphaga
- Infraorder: Cucujiformia
- Family: Cerambycidae
- Genus: Glenea
- Species: G. masakii

Binomial name
- Glenea masakii Makihara, 1978

Synonyms
- Glenea chrysomaculata Masaki, 1941

Species of beetle

Glenea masakii is a species of beetle in the family Cerambycidae. It was described by Hiroshi Makihara in 1978. It is known from Japan. It measures between 13 and 14 mm (0.51 and 0.55 in).
