= Glenea insignis =

Scientific classification
- Domain: Eukaryota
- Kingdom: Animalia
- Phylum: Arthropoda
- Class: Insecta
- Order: Coleoptera
- Suborder: Polyphaga
- Infraorder: Cucujiformia
- Family: Cerambycidae
- Genus: Glenea
- Species: G. insignis

Binomial name
- Glenea insignis Aurivillius, 1903

Species of beetle

Glenea insignis is a species of beetle in the family Cerambycidae. It was described by Per Olof Christopher Aurivillius in 1903. It is known from the Republic of the Congo, the Democratic Republic of the Congo, the Central African Republic, Cameroon, and Uganda.
