= Glenea manto =

Scientific classification
- Kingdom: Animalia
- Phylum: Arthropoda
- Clade: Pancrustacea
- Class: Insecta
- Order: Coleoptera
- Suborder: Polyphaga
- Infraorder: Cucujiformia
- Family: Cerambycidae
- Genus: Glenea
- Species: G. manto

Binomial name
- Glenea manto Pascoe, 1866

Synonyms
- Glenea manto m. collaroides Breuning, 1958

Species of beetle

Glenea manto is a species of beetle in the family Cerambycidae. It was described by Francis Polkinghorne Pascoe in 1866. It is known from Malaysia, Sumatra, Borneo and Java.
