= Glenea albocingulata =

Scientific classification
- Kingdom: Animalia
- Phylum: Arthropoda
- Clade: Pancrustacea
- Class: Insecta
- Order: Coleoptera
- Suborder: Polyphaga
- Infraorder: Cucujiformia
- Family: Cerambycidae
- Genus: Glenea
- Species: G. albocingulata

Binomial name
- Glenea albocingulata Aurivillius, 1925

Synonyms
- Glenea signaticornis Breuning, 1956

Species of beetle

Glenea albocingulata is a species of beetle in the family Cerambycidae. It was described by Per Olof Christopher Aurivillius in 1925. It is known from Java and Borneo.
