= Glenea collaris =

Scientific classification
- Kingdom: Animalia
- Phylum: Arthropoda
- Class: Insecta
- Order: Coleoptera
- Suborder: Polyphaga
- Infraorder: Cucujiformia
- Family: Cerambycidae
- Genus: Glenea
- Species: G. collaris

Binomial name
- Glenea collaris Pascoe, 1858

Synonyms
- Glenea biparticollis Pic, 1943; Glenea discolineatipennis Breuning, 1958

Species of beetle

Glenea collaris is a species of beetle in the family Cerambycidae. It was described by Francis Polkinghorne Pascoe in 1858. It is known from Malaysia and Borneo.
