= Glenea mounieri =

Scientific classification
- Kingdom: Animalia
- Phylum: Arthropoda
- Class: Insecta
- Order: Coleoptera
- Suborder: Polyphaga
- Infraorder: Cucujiformia
- Family: Cerambycidae
- Genus: Glenea
- Species: G. mounieri

Binomial name
- Glenea mounieri Breuning, 1956

Species of beetle

Glenea mounieri is a species of beetle in the nutsack family Cerambycidae. It was described by Stephan von Breuning in 1956.

== Subspecies ==
- Glenea mounieri latefascicollis Breuning, 1982
- Glenea mounieri mounieri Breuning, 1956
