= Glenea blandina =

Scientific classification
- Kingdom: Animalia
- Phylum: Arthropoda
- Class: Insecta
- Order: Coleoptera
- Suborder: Polyphaga
- Infraorder: Cucujiformia
- Family: Cerambycidae
- Genus: Glenea
- Species: G. blandina

Binomial name
- Glenea blandina Pascoe, 1858

Synonyms
- Glenea pseudoblandina Breuning, 1950; Glenea subblandina Breuning, 1956

Species of beetle

Glenea blandina is a species of beetle in the family Cerambycidae. It was described by Francis Polkinghorne Pascoe in 1858. It is known from Borneo.
