= Glenea pascoei =

Scientific classification
- Kingdom: Animalia
- Phylum: Arthropoda
- Class: Insecta
- Order: Coleoptera
- Suborder: Polyphaga
- Infraorder: Cucujiformia
- Family: Cerambycidae
- Genus: Glenea
- Species: G. pascoei

Binomial name
- Glenea pascoei Aurivillius, 1923

Synonyms
- Glenea pulchella Pascoe, 1867 nec Pascoe, 1857

Species of beetle

Glenea pascoei is a species of beetle in the family Cerambycidae. It was described by Per Olof Christopher Aurivillius in 1923 and is known from Borneo.
