= Glenea sjoestedti =

Scientific classification
- Kingdom: Animalia
- Phylum: Arthropoda
- Class: Insecta
- Order: Coleoptera
- Suborder: Polyphaga
- Infraorder: Cucujiformia
- Family: Cerambycidae
- Genus: Glenea
- Species: G. sjoestedti

Binomial name
- Glenea sjoestedti Aurivillius, 1903

Synonyms
- Glenea sjöstedti Aurivillius, 1903

Species of beetle

Glenea sjoestedti is a species of beetle in the family Cerambycidae. It was described by Per Olof Christopher Aurivillius in 1903 and is known from Cameroon.
