= Glenea cleome =

Scientific classification
- Domain: Eukaryota
- Kingdom: Animalia
- Phylum: Arthropoda
- Class: Insecta
- Order: Coleoptera
- Suborder: Polyphaga
- Infraorder: Cucujiformia
- Family: Cerambycidae
- Genus: Glenea
- Species: G. cleome

Binomial name
- Glenea cleome Pascoe, 1867

Synonyms
- Glenea cleone (Pascoe) Breuning, 1956 (misspelling)

Species of beetle

Glenea cleome is a species of beetle in the family Cerambycidae. It was described by Francis Polkinghorne Pascoe in 1867.
