= Glenea doriai =

Scientific classification
- Kingdom: Animalia
- Phylum: Arthropoda
- Class: Insecta
- Order: Coleoptera
- Suborder: Polyphaga
- Infraorder: Cucujiformia
- Family: Cerambycidae
- Genus: Glenea
- Species: G. doriai

Binomial name
- Glenea doriai Breuning, 1950

Synonyms
- Glenea discomediopumctata Breuning, 1956; Glenea infraflavovittata Breuning, 1956

Species of beetle

Glenea doriai is a species of beetle in the family Cerambycidae. It was described by Stephan von Breuning in 1950. It is known from Borneo.
