= Glenea discoidalis =

Scientific classification
- Kingdom: Animalia
- Phylum: Arthropoda
- Class: Insecta
- Order: Coleoptera
- Suborder: Polyphaga
- Infraorder: Cucujiformia
- Family: Cerambycidae
- Genus: Glenea
- Species: G. discoidalis

Binomial name
- Glenea discoidalis Pascoe, 1867

Synonyms
- Glenea simplex J. Thomson, 1879

Species of beetle

Glenea discoidalis is a species of beetle in the family Cerambycidae. It was described by Francis Polkinghorne Pascoe in 1867. It is known from Malaysia and Borneo.
