= Glenea matangensis =

Scientific classification
- Kingdom: Animalia
- Phylum: Arthropoda
- Class: Insecta
- Order: Coleoptera
- Suborder: Polyphaga
- Infraorder: Cucujiformia
- Family: Cerambycidae
- Genus: Glenea
- Species: G. matangensis

Binomial name
- Glenea matangensis Aurivillius, 1911

Species of beetle

Glenea matangensis is a species of beetle in the family Cerambycidae. It was described by Per Olof Christopher Aurivillius in 1911. It is known from Borneo, Malaysia and Brunei. It contains the variety Glenea matangensis var. rufimembris.
