= Glenea miniacea =

Scientific classification
- Domain: Eukaryota
- Kingdom: Animalia
- Phylum: Arthropoda
- Class: Insecta
- Order: Coleoptera
- Suborder: Polyphaga
- Infraorder: Cucujiformia
- Family: Cerambycidae
- Genus: Glenea
- Species: G. miniacea

Binomial name
- Glenea miniacea Pascoe, 1867

Synonyms
- Glenea danae Gestro, 1875

Species of beetle

Glenea miniacea is a species of beetle in the family Cerambycidae. It was described by Francis Polkinghorne Pascoe in 1867.
