= Glenea ochreosignata =

Scientific classification
- Domain: Eukaryota
- Kingdom: Animalia
- Phylum: Arthropoda
- Class: Insecta
- Order: Coleoptera
- Suborder: Polyphaga
- Infraorder: Cucujiformia
- Family: Cerambycidae
- Genus: Glenea
- Species: G. ochreosignata

Binomial name
- Glenea ochreosignata Hüdepohl, 1995

Species of beetle

Glenea ochreosignata is a species of beetle in the family Cerambycidae. It was described by Karl-Ernst Hüdepohl in 1995. It is known from Malaysia.
