= Glenea hieroglyphica =

Scientific classification
- Domain: Eukaryota
- Kingdom: Animalia
- Phylum: Arthropoda
- Class: Insecta
- Order: Coleoptera
- Suborder: Polyphaga
- Infraorder: Cucujiformia
- Family: Cerambycidae
- Genus: Glenea
- Species: G. hieroglyphica

Binomial name
- Glenea hieroglyphica Pesarini & Sabbadini, 1997

Species of beetle

Glenea hieroglyphica is a species of beetle in the family Cerambycidae. It was described by Pesarini and Sabbadini in 1997.
