= Glenea paradiana =

Scientific classification
- Kingdom: Animalia
- Phylum: Arthropoda
- Clade: Pancrustacea
- Class: Insecta
- Order: Coleoptera
- Suborder: Polyphaga
- Infraorder: Cucujiformia
- Family: Cerambycidae
- Genus: Glenea
- Species: G. paradiana

Binomial name
- Glenea paradiana Lin & Montreuil, 2009

Species of beetle

Glenea paradiana is a species of beetle in the family Cerambycidae. It was described by Lin and Montreuil in 2009. It is known from Vietnam and Laos.
