= Glenea nobilis =

Scientific classification
- Kingdom: Animalia
- Phylum: Arthropoda
- Clade: Pancrustacea
- Class: Insecta
- Order: Coleoptera
- Suborder: Polyphaga
- Infraorder: Cucujiformia
- Family: Cerambycidae
- Genus: Glenea
- Species: G. nobilis

Binomial name
- Glenea nobilis Schwarzer, 1931

Species of beetle

Glenea nobilis is a species of beetle in the family Cerambycidae. It was described by Bernhard Schwarzer in 1931. It is known from Java and Borneo.
