= Glenea transversefasciata =

Scientific classification
- Domain: Eukaryota
- Kingdom: Animalia
- Phylum: Arthropoda
- Class: Insecta
- Order: Coleoptera
- Suborder: Polyphaga
- Infraorder: Cucujiformia
- Family: Cerambycidae
- Genus: Glenea
- Species: G. transversefasciata

Binomial name
- Glenea transversefasciata Hüdepohl, 1996

Species of beetle

Glenea transversefasciata is a species of beetle in the family Cerambycidae. It was described by Karl-Ernst Hüdepohl in 1996.
