= Glenea estanleyi =

Scientific classification
- Domain: Eukaryota
- Kingdom: Animalia
- Phylum: Arthropoda
- Class: Insecta
- Order: Coleoptera
- Suborder: Polyphaga
- Infraorder: Cucujiformia
- Family: Cerambycidae
- Genus: Glenea
- Species: G. estanleyi

Binomial name
- Glenea estanleyi (Vives, 2009)

Species of beetle

Glenea (Parazosne) estanleyi is a species of beetle in the family Cerambycidae. It was described by Vives in 2009. It is known from the Philippines.
