= Glenea sarasinorum =

Scientific classification
- Kingdom: Animalia
- Phylum: Arthropoda
- Clade: Pancrustacea
- Class: Insecta
- Order: Coleoptera
- Suborder: Polyphaga
- Infraorder: Cucujiformia
- Family: Cerambycidae
- Genus: Glenea
- Species: G. sarasinorum

Binomial name
- Glenea sarasinorum Heller, 1896

Species of beetle

Glenea sarasinorum is a species of beetle in the family Cerambycidae. It was described by Heller in 1896. It is known from Sulawesi.
