= Glenea shuteae =

Scientific classification
- Domain: Eukaryota
- Kingdom: Animalia
- Phylum: Arthropoda
- Class: Insecta
- Order: Coleoptera
- Suborder: Polyphaga
- Infraorder: Cucujiformia
- Family: Cerambycidae
- Genus: Glenea
- Species: G. shuteae

Binomial name
- Glenea shuteae (Lin & Yang, 2011)

Species of beetle

Glenea shuteae is a species of beetles from the family Cerambycidae. The scientific name of this species was first published in 2011 by Lin & Yang.
