= Glenea changchini =

Scientific classification
- Domain: Eukaryota
- Kingdom: Animalia
- Phylum: Arthropoda
- Class: Insecta
- Order: Coleoptera
- Suborder: Polyphaga
- Infraorder: Cucujiformia
- Family: Cerambycidae
- Genus: Glenea
- Species: G. changchini

Binomial name
- Glenea changchini Lin & Lin, 2011

Species of beetle

Glenea changchini is a species of beetle in the family Cerambycidae. It was described by Lin and Lin in 2011. It is known from Vietnam and China.
