= Glenea sexguttata =

Scientific classification
- Kingdom: Animalia
- Phylum: Arthropoda
- Class: Insecta
- Order: Coleoptera
- Suborder: Polyphaga
- Infraorder: Cucujiformia
- Family: Cerambycidae
- Genus: Glenea
- Species: G. sexguttata

Binomial name
- Glenea sexguttata Aurivillius, 1925

Species of beetle

Glenea sexguttata is a species of beetle in the family Cerambycidae. It was described by Per Olof Christopher Aurivillius in 1925 and is known from Borneo.
