= Glenea wegneri =

Scientific classification
- Kingdom: Animalia
- Phylum: Arthropoda
- Class: Insecta
- Order: Coleoptera
- Suborder: Polyphaga
- Infraorder: Cucujiformia
- Family: Cerambycidae
- Genus: Glenea
- Species: G. wegneri

Binomial name
- Glenea wegneri Gilmour & Breuning, 1963

Species of beetle

Glenea wegneri is a species of beetle in the family Cerambycidae. It was described by Gilmour and Stephan von Breuning in 1963. It is known from Borneo.
