= Glenea wongi =

Scientific classification
- Kingdom: Animalia
- Phylum: Arthropoda
- Class: Insecta
- Order: Coleoptera
- Suborder: Polyphaga
- Infraorder: Cucujiformia
- Family: Cerambycidae
- Genus: Glenea
- Species: G. wongi

Binomial name
- Glenea wongi Hüdepohl, 1987

Species of beetle

Glenea wongi is a species of beetle in the family Cerambycidae. It was described by Karl-Ernst Hüdepohl in 1987. It is known from Malaysia and Borneo.
