= Glenea iligana =

Scientific classification
- Domain: Eukaryota
- Kingdom: Animalia
- Phylum: Arthropoda
- Class: Insecta
- Order: Coleoptera
- Suborder: Polyphaga
- Infraorder: Cucujiformia
- Family: Cerambycidae
- Genus: Glenea
- Species: G. iligana

Binomial name
- Glenea iligana Aurivillius, 1926

Species of beetle

Glenea iligana is a species of beetle in the family Cerambycidae. It was described by Per Olof Christopher Aurivillius in 1926.
