= Glenea kusamai =

Scientific classification
- Domain: Eukaryota
- Kingdom: Animalia
- Phylum: Arthropoda
- Class: Insecta
- Order: Coleoptera
- Suborder: Polyphaga
- Infraorder: Cucujiformia
- Family: Cerambycidae
- Genus: Glenea
- Species: G. kusamai

Binomial name
- Glenea kusamai Makihara, 1988

Species of beetle

Glenea kusamai is a species of beetle in the family Cerambycidae. It was described by Hiroshi Makihara in 1988.
