= Glenea trimaculipennis =

Scientific classification
- Kingdom: Animalia
- Phylum: Arthropoda
- Class: Insecta
- Order: Coleoptera
- Suborder: Polyphaga
- Infraorder: Cucujiformia
- Family: Cerambycidae
- Genus: Glenea
- Species: G. trimaculipennis

Binomial name
- Glenea trimaculipennis Breuning, 1959

Species of beetle

Glenea trimaculipennis is a species of beetle in the family Cerambycidae. It was described by Stephan von Breuning in 1959.
