= Glenea regularis =

Scientific classification
- Domain: Eukaryota
- Kingdom: Animalia
- Phylum: Arthropoda
- Class: Insecta
- Order: Coleoptera
- Suborder: Polyphaga
- Infraorder: Cucujiformia
- Family: Cerambycidae
- Genus: Glenea
- Species: G. regularis

Binomial name
- Glenea regularis Newman, 1842

Species of beetle

Glenea regularis is a species of beetle in the family Cerambycidae. It was described by Newman in 1842. It is known from the Philippines.
