= Glenea iwasakii =

Scientific classification
- Domain: Eukaryota
- Kingdom: Animalia
- Phylum: Arthropoda
- Class: Insecta
- Order: Coleoptera
- Suborder: Polyphaga
- Infraorder: Cucujiformia
- Family: Cerambycidae
- Genus: Glenea
- Species: G. iwasakii

Binomial name
- Glenea iwasakii Kono, 1933

Species of beetle

Glenea iwasakii is a species of beetle in the family Cerambycidae. It was described by Kono in 1933.
