= Glenea dorsaloides =

Scientific classification
- Kingdom: Animalia
- Phylum: Arthropoda
- Class: Insecta
- Order: Coleoptera
- Suborder: Polyphaga
- Infraorder: Cucujiformia
- Family: Cerambycidae
- Genus: Glenea
- Species: G. dorsaloides

Binomial name
- Glenea dorsaloides Breuning, 1956

Species of beetle

Glenea dorsaloides is a species of beetle in the family Cerambycidae. It was described by Stephan von Breuning in 1956.
