= Glenea bankoi =

Scientific classification
- Domain: Eukaryota
- Kingdom: Animalia
- Phylum: Arthropoda
- Class: Insecta
- Order: Coleoptera
- Suborder: Polyphaga
- Infraorder: Cucujiformia
- Family: Cerambycidae
- Genus: Glenea
- Species: G. bankoi

Binomial name
- Glenea bankoi Garreau, 2011

Species of beetle

Glenea bankoi is a species of beetle in the family Cerambycidae. It was described by Garreau in 2011.
