= Glenea proxima =

Scientific classification
- Domain: Eukaryota
- Kingdom: Animalia
- Phylum: Arthropoda
- Class: Insecta
- Order: Coleoptera
- Suborder: Polyphaga
- Infraorder: Cucujiformia
- Family: Cerambycidae
- Genus: Glenea
- Species: G. proxima

Binomial name
- Glenea proxima Lameere, 1893

Species of beetle

Glenea proxima is a species of beetle in the family Cerambycidae. It was described by Lameere in 1893.
