= Glenea atricornis =

Scientific classification
- Kingdom: Animalia
- Phylum: Arthropoda
- Class: Insecta
- Order: Coleoptera
- Suborder: Polyphaga
- Infraorder: Cucujiformia
- Family: Cerambycidae
- Genus: Glenea
- Species: G. atricornis

Binomial name
- Glenea atricornis Pic, 1943

Species of beetle

Glenea atricornis is a species of beetle in the family Cerambycidae, described by Maurice Pic in 1943.
