= Glenea nanshanchiana =

Scientific classification
- Kingdom: Animalia
- Phylum: Arthropoda
- Class: Insecta
- Order: Coleoptera
- Suborder: Polyphaga
- Infraorder: Cucujiformia
- Family: Cerambycidae
- Genus: Glenea
- Species: G. nanshanchiana

Binomial name
- Glenea nanshanchiana Hayashi, 1978

Species of beetle

Glenea nanshanchiana is a species of beetle in the family Cerambycidae.
