= Glenea basilana =

Scientific classification
- Kingdom: Animalia
- Phylum: Arthropoda
- Class: Insecta
- Order: Coleoptera
- Suborder: Polyphaga
- Infraorder: Cucujiformia
- Family: Cerambycidae
- Genus: Glenea
- Species: G. basilana

Binomial name
- Glenea basilana Pic, 1943

Species of beetle

Glenea basilana is a species of beetle in the family Cerambycidae. It was described by Maurice Pic in 1943.
