= Glenea licenti =

Scientific classification
- Kingdom: Animalia
- Phylum: Arthropoda
- Class: Insecta
- Order: Coleoptera
- Suborder: Polyphaga
- Infraorder: Cucujiformia
- Family: Cerambycidae
- Genus: Glenea
- Species: G. licenti

Binomial name
- Glenea licenti Pic, 1939

Species of beetle

Glenea licenti is a species of beetle in the family Cerambycidae. It was described by Maurice Pic in 1939.
