= Glenea extrema =

Scientific classification
- Kingdom: Animalia
- Phylum: Arthropoda
- Class: Insecta
- Order: Coleoptera
- Suborder: Polyphaga
- Infraorder: Cucujiformia
- Family: Cerambycidae
- Genus: Glenea
- Species: G. extrema

Binomial name
- Glenea extrema Sharp, 1900

Species of beetle

Glenea extrema is a species of beetle in the family Cerambycidae. It was described by David Sharp in 1900.
