= Glenea nigerrima =

Scientific classification
- Kingdom: Animalia
- Phylum: Arthropoda
- Class: Insecta
- Order: Coleoptera
- Suborder: Polyphaga
- Infraorder: Cucujiformia
- Family: Cerambycidae
- Genus: Glenea
- Species: G. nigerrima

Binomial name
- Glenea nigerrima Breuning, 1953

Species of beetle

Glenea nigerrima is a species of beetle in the family Cerambycidae.
