= Glenea fainanensis =

Scientific classification
- Kingdom: Animalia
- Phylum: Arthropoda
- Class: Insecta
- Order: Coleoptera
- Suborder: Polyphaga
- Infraorder: Cucujiformia
- Family: Cerambycidae
- Genus: Glenea
- Species: G. fainanensis

Binomial name
- Glenea fainanensis Pic, 1916

Species of beetle

Glenea fainanensis is a species of beetle in the family Cerambycidae.
