= Glenea pallidipes =

Scientific classification
- Kingdom: Animalia
- Phylum: Arthropoda
- Class: Insecta
- Order: Coleoptera
- Suborder: Polyphaga
- Infraorder: Cucujiformia
- Family: Cerambycidae
- Genus: Glenea
- Species: G. pallidipes

Binomial name
- Glenea pallidipes Pic, 1926

Species of beetle

Glenea pallidipes is a species of beetle in the family Cerambycidae.
