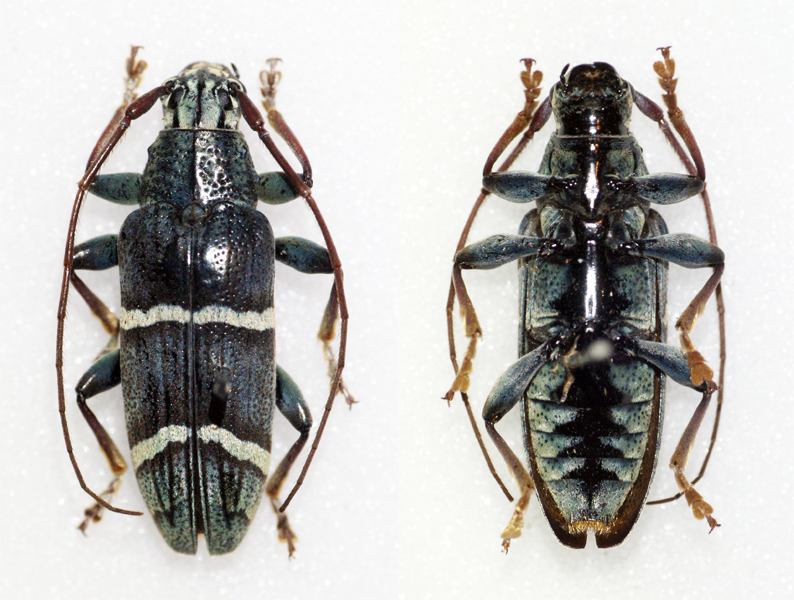

Scientific classification
- Domain: Eukaryota
- Kingdom: Animalia
- Phylum: Arthropoda
- Class: Insecta
- Order: Coleoptera
- Suborder: Polyphaga
- Infraorder: Cucujiformia
- Family: Cerambycidae
- Genus: Tmesisternus
- Species: T. tersus

Binomial name
- Tmesisternus tersus Pascoe, 1862

Synonyms
- Tmesisternus quadrifasciatus Thomson, 1865

= Tmesisternus tersus =

Species of beetle

Tmesisternus tersus is a species of beetle in the family Cerambycidae. It was described by Francis Polkinghorne Pascoe in 1862.
