= Tmesisternus wallacei =

Scientific classification
- Kingdom: Animalia
- Phylum: Arthropoda
- Class: Insecta
- Order: Coleoptera
- Suborder: Polyphaga
- Infraorder: Cucujiformia
- Family: Cerambycidae
- Genus: Tmesisternus
- Species: T. wallacei

Binomial name
- Tmesisternus wallacei Pascoe, 1858

Species of beetle

Tmesisternus wallacei is a species of beetle in the family Cerambycidae. It was described by Francis Polkinghorne Pascoe in 1858. It is known from Moluccas.
