= Tmesisternus immitis =

Scientific classification
- Domain: Eukaryota
- Kingdom: Animalia
- Phylum: Arthropoda
- Class: Insecta
- Order: Coleoptera
- Suborder: Polyphaga
- Infraorder: Cucujiformia
- Family: Cerambycidae
- Genus: Tmesisternus
- Species: T. immitis

Binomial name
- Tmesisternus immitis Pascoe, 1867

Synonyms
- Tmesisternus tesselatus Breuning, 1945

Species of beetle

Tmesisternus immitis is a species of beetle in the family Cerambycidae. It was described by Francis Polkinghorne Pascoe 1867.
