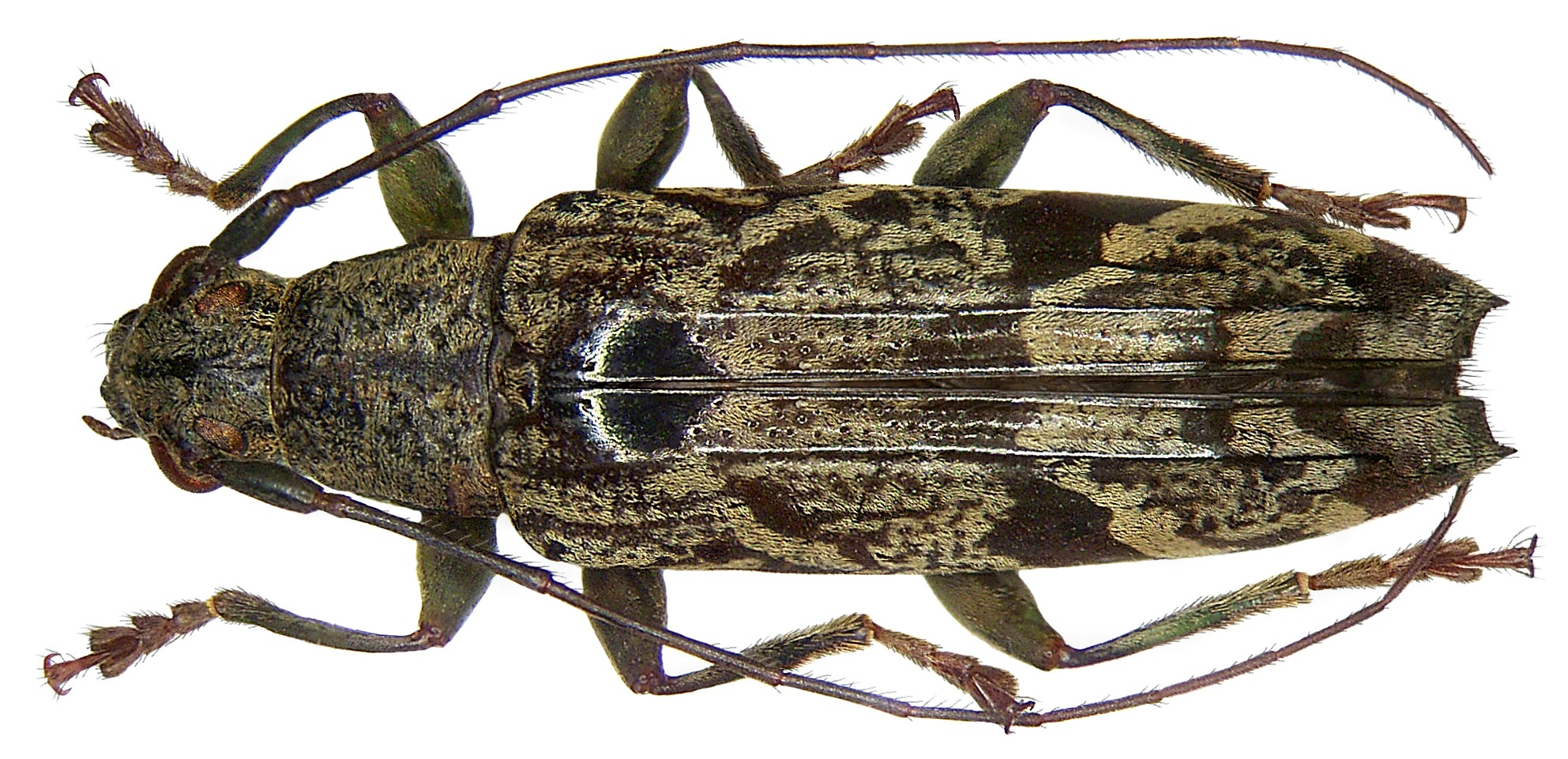

Scientific classification
- Domain: Eukaryota
- Kingdom: Animalia
- Phylum: Arthropoda
- Class: Insecta
- Order: Coleoptera
- Suborder: Polyphaga
- Infraorder: Cucujiformia
- Family: Cerambycidae
- Genus: Tmesisternus
- Species: T. froggatti

Binomial name
- Tmesisternus froggatti McLeay, 1868

Synonyms
- Tmesisternus frogatti Breuning, 1945

= Tmesisternus froggatti =

Species of beetle

Tmesisternus froggatti is a species of beetle in the family Cerambycidae. It was described by McLeay in 1868.
