= Tmesisternus indistinctelineatus =

Scientific classification
- Kingdom: Animalia
- Phylum: Arthropoda
- Class: Insecta
- Order: Coleoptera
- Suborder: Polyphaga
- Infraorder: Cucujiformia
- Family: Cerambycidae
- Genus: Tmesisternus
- Species: T. indistinctelineatus

Binomial name
- Tmesisternus indistinctelineatus Breuning, 1966

Species of beetle

Tmesisternus indistinctelineatus is a species of beetle in the family Cerambycidae.
