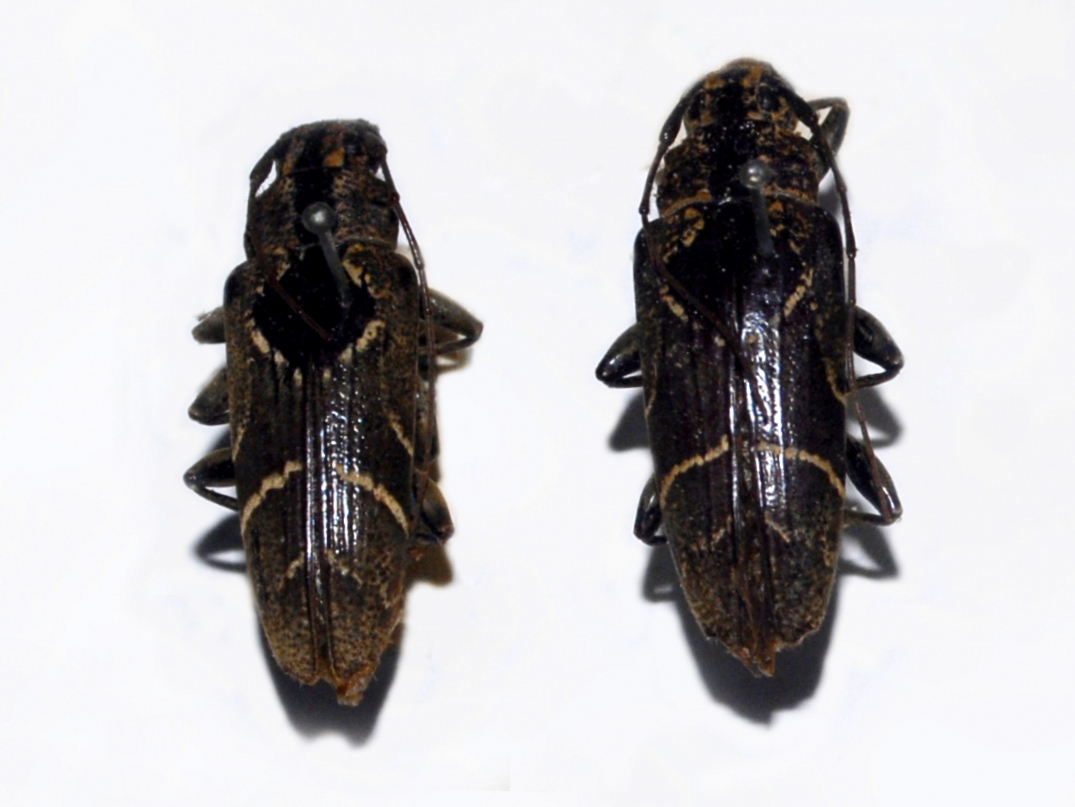
- Tmesisternus adspersus. Mounted specimen

Scientific classification
- Kingdom: Animalia
- Phylum: Arthropoda
- Class: Insecta
- Order: Coleoptera
- Suborder: Polyphaga
- Infraorder: Cucujiformia
- Family: Cerambycidae
- Subfamily: Lamiinae
- Tribe: Tmesisternini
- Genus: Tmesisternus; Latreille, 1829

Synonyms
- Ichthyosoma Montrouzier, 1855; Arrhenotus Pascoe, 1858; Ichthyosomus Dejean, 1835; Apolia Thomson, 1864; Polyxo Thomson, 1864; Mneside Thomson, 1864; Tmesisternopsis Breuning, 1945; Roodenburgia Withaar, 2015

= Tmesisternus =

Genus of beetles

Tmesisternus is a genus of longhorn beetles belonging to the family Cerambycidae, subfamily Lamiinae.

== Species ==
Tmesisternus contains the following species:

- Tmesisternus abmisibilis Withaar, 2011
- Tmesisternus adspersarius Breuning, 1939
- Tmesisternus adspersus Blanchard, 1953
- Tmesisternus aeneofasciatus Breuning, 1948
- Tmesisternus affinis Breuning, 1939
- Tmesisternus agrarius Pascoe, 1867
- Tmesisternus agriloides Pascoe, 1867
- Tmesisternus albari Withaar, 2009
- Tmesisternus albertisi Breuning, 1939
- Tmesisternus albovittatus Breuning, 1939
- Tmesisternus andaii Gilmour, 1952
- Tmesisternus andreas (Kreische, 1926)
- Tmesisternus angae Gressitt, 1984
- Tmesisternus anomalus Gressitt, 1984
- Tmesisternus apicalis Aurivillius, 1927
- Tmesisternus arabukae Gressitt, 1984
- Tmesisternus araucarius Withaar, 2017
- Tmesisternus arfakianus Gestro, 1876
- Tmesisternus asaroanus Gressitt, 1984
- Tmesisternus assimilis Breuning, 1975
- Tmesisternus atrofasciatus Gressitt, 1984
- Tmesisternus attenuatus Gressitt, 1984
- Tmesisternus aubrooki Gilmour, 1949
- Tmesisternus avarus Pascoe, 1867
- Tmesisternus batchianensis Breuning, 1954
- Tmesisternus bazuini Withaar, 2011
- Tmesisternus beehleri Gressitt, 1984
- Tmesisternus benjamini Breuning, 1966
- Tmesisternus bezarki Weigel, 2006
- Tmesisternus biarciferus Blanchard, 1953
- Tmesisternus bifoveatus Aurivillius, 1924
- Tmesisternus bifuscomaculatus Breuning, 1939
- Tmesisternus bilaterimaculatus Breuning, 1966
- Tmesisternus bioculatus Gressitt, 1984
- Tmesisternus bizonulatus Guerin-Meneville, 1831
- Tmesisternus bodemensis Withaar, 2011
- Tmesisternus bolanicus Breuning, 1939
- Tmesisternus bosavi Gressitt, 1984
- Tmesisternus bosaviensis Gressitt, 1984
- Tmesisternus bosavius Withaar, 2017
- Tmesisternus brandti Gressitt, 1984
- Tmesisternus brassi Gressitt, 1984
- Tmesisternus breuningi Gilmour, 1950
- Tmesisternus brevespinosus Breuning & de Jong, 1941
- Tmesisternus bruijni Gestro, 1876
- Tmesisternus burgersi Withaar, 2017
- Tmesisternus canofasciatus (Aurivillius, 1927)
- Tmesisternus carlae Withaar, 2017
- Tmesisternus cinnamomeus Gilmour, 1950
- Tmesisternus clissoldi Withaar, 2018
- Tmesisternus coloribus Withaar, 2018
- Tmesisternus conicicollis (Thomson, 1864)
- Tmesisternus convexus Gressitt, 1984
- Tmesisternus costatus Breuning, 1939
- Tmesisternus costiceps Breuning, 1967
- Tmesisternus costipennis Breuning, 1940
- Tmesisternus costulatus Breuning, 1939
- Tmesisternus cuneatus Gressitt, 1984
- Tmesisternus cupreosignatus Aurivillius, 1907
- Tmesisternus curvatolineatus (Aurivillius, 1927)
- Tmesisternus defobi Withaar, 2009
- Tmesisternus demissus Breuning, 1939
- Tmesisternus densepunctatus Breuning, 1939
- Tmesisternus denticollis Gressitt, 1984
- Tmesisternus devosi Withaar, 2009
- Tmesisternus digoelae Withaar, 2018
- Tmesisternus discomaculatus Breuning, 1939
- Tmesisternus dissimilis Pascoe, 1867
- Tmesisternus distinctus Boisduval, 1935
- Tmesisternus divisus Aurivillius, 1927
- Tmesisternus dohertyi Jordan, 1894
- Tmesisternus dubius Montrouzier, 1855
- Tmesisternus elateroides Gestro, 1876
- Tmesisternus elegans Heller, 1914
- Tmesisternus eliptaminus Withaar, 2014
- Tmesisternus ellenae Withaar, 2017
- Tmesisternus elvirae Weigel, 2003
- Tmesisternus excellens Aurivillius, 1908
- Tmesisternus finisterrae Gressitt, 1984
- Tmesisternus flavolineatipennis Breuning, 1975
- Tmesisternus flavolineatus Breuning, 1939
- Tmesisternus flavovittatus Breuning & de Jong, 1941
- Tmesisternus floorjansenae Weigel, 2018
- Tmesisternus florensis Breuning, 1948
- Tmesisternus floresianus Withaar, 2009
- Tmesisternus flyensis Gressitt, 1984
- Tmesisternus frogatti Macleay, 1886
- Tmesisternus fulgens Breuning, 1939
- Tmesisternus fumatus Gressitt, 1984
- Tmesisternus fuscosignatus Breuning, 1945
- Tmesisternus gabrieli Schwarzer, 1931
- Tmesisternus geelvinkianus Gestro, 1876
- Tmesisternus geniculatus Breuning, 1948
- Tmesisternus gerstmeieri Weigel, 2018
- Tmesisternus giluwe Gressitt, 1984
- Tmesisternus glabrum Withaar, 2013
- Tmesisternus goilalae Gressitt, 1984
- Tmesisternus gracilis Gressitt, 1984
- Tmesisternus gressitti Weigel, 2001
- Tmesisternus grimmi Weigel, 2018
- Tmesisternus griseovittatus Breuning, 1939
- Tmesisternus griseus (Thomson, 1865)
- Tmesisternus habbemanus Gressitt, 1984
- Tmesisternus helleri Kreische, 1926
- Tmesisternus herbaceus Pascoe, 1862
- Tmesisternus heurni (Schwarzer, 1924)
- Tmesisternus hieroglyphicus Blanchard, 1853
- Tmesisternus holzschuhi Weigel, 2018
- Tmesisternus hoyoisi Weigel, 2006
- Tmesisternus huedepohli Weigel, 2018
- Tmesisternus humeralis Aurivillius, 1923
- Tmesisternus imitans Breuning, 1939
- Tmesisternus immitis Pascoe, 1867
- Tmesisternus indistinctelineatus Breuning, 1966
- Tmesisternus insularis Gressitt, 1984
- Tmesisternus intricatus Pascoe, 1867
- Tmesisternus irregularis Gestro, 1876
- Tmesisternus isabellae Vollenhoven, 1871
- Tmesisternus jakli Weigel, 2018
- Tmesisternus japeni Gilmour, 1949
- Tmesisternus jaspideus Boisduval, 1853
- Tmesisternus joliveti Breuning, 1970
- Tmesisternus kaindi Gressitt, 1985
- Tmesisternus kapauku Gressitt, 1984
- Tmesisternus karimui Gressitt, 1984
- Tmesisternus keitocali Breuning, 1972
- Tmesisternus kurima Weigel, 2018
- Tmesisternus lacustris Gressitt, 1984
- Tmesisternus laensis Gressitt, 1984
- Tmesisternus laevis Breuning, 1976
- Tmesisternus lamingtonus Gressitt, 1984
- Tmesisternus lansbergei Breuning, 1945
- Tmesisternus lateralis Macleay, 1886
- Tmesisternus laterimaculatus Gilmour, 1949
- Tmesisternus latifascia Heller, 1914
- Tmesisternus latithorax Gressitt, 1984
- Tmesisternus lepidus Pascoe, 1867
- Tmesisternus lictorius (Pascoe, 1867)
- Tmesisternus liebeni Withaar, 2009
- Tmesisternus lineatus Macleay, 1886
- Tmesisternus loebli Weigel, 2018
- Tmesisternus lordbergia Withaar, 2011
- Tmesisternus lotor Pascoe, 1959
- Tmesisternus lucens Breuning, 1970
- Tmesisternus ludificator (Heller, 1914)
- Tmesisternus lugubris Breuning, 1939
- Tmesisternus luteostriatus Heller, 1912
- Tmesisternus maai Gressitt, 1984
- Tmesisternus mamberamo Gressitt, 1984
- Tmesisternus margaretae Gilmour, 1949
- Tmesisternus marginalis Breuning, 1939
- Tmesisternus marmoratus Guerin-Meneville, 1831
- Tmesisternus mehli Weigel, 2008
- Tmesisternus meridionalis Gressitt, 1984
- Tmesisternus metalliceps Breuning, 1940
- Tmesisternus mewana Withaar, 2018
- Tmesisternus mimethes (Kreische, 1926)
- Tmesisternus modestus Gahan, 1915
- Tmesisternus mokwamensis Withaar, 2013
- Tmesisternus montanus Gressitt, 1984
- Tmesisternus monteithi Gressitt, 1984
- Tmesisternus monticola Gestro, 1876
- Tmesisternus mucronatus Gahan, 1915
- Tmesisternus multiplicatus Gahan, 1915
- Tmesisternus nabirensis Gressitt, 1984
- Tmesisternus nami Gressitt, 1984
- Tmesisternus nielsius Withaar, 2017
- Tmesisternus niger Gressitt, 1984
- Tmesisternus nigrofasciatus Aurivillius, 1908
- Tmesisternus nigrotriangularis Heller, 1914
- Tmesisternus nitidus Gressitt, 1984
- Tmesisternus obliquefasciatus Breuning, 1939
- Tmesisternus obliquelineatus Breuning, 1939
- Tmesisternus obliquevittatus Breuning, 1973
- Tmesisternus oblongus Boisduval, 1835
- Tmesisternus obsoletus Blanchard, 1953
- Tmesisternus obtusatus Gressitt, 1984
- Tmesisternus ochraceosignatus Breuning, 1939
- Tmesisternus ochreomaculatus Breuning, 1942
- Tmesisternus ochrostictus Gressitt, 1984
- Tmesisternus octopunctatus Gilmour, 1949
- Tmesisternus olthofi Gressitt, 1984
- Tmesisternus opalescens Pascoe, 1867
- Tmesisternus oransbarius Withaar, 2016
- Tmesisternus ornatus Breuning, 1939
- Tmesisternus paniae Gressitt, 1984
- Tmesisternus papuanus Breuning, 1945
- Tmesisternus parasulcatus Breuning, 1975
- Tmesisternus parobiensis Breuning, 1969
- Tmesisternus parvus Withaar, 2016
- Tmesisternus pauli (Heller, 1897)
- Tmesisternus persimilis Breuning, 1969
- Tmesisternus petechialis Pascoe, 1867
- Tmesisternus phaleratus (Thomson, 1865)
- Tmesisternus planicollis Gressitt, 1884
- Tmesisternus planus Withaar, 2016
- Tmesisternus pleuristictus Pascoe, 1867
- Tmesisternus politus Blanchard, 1853
- Tmesisternus popondettae Gressitt, 1984
- Tmesisternus postfasciatus Breuning & de Jong, 1941
- Tmesisternus postflavescens Breuning, 1948
- Tmesisternus postglaber Breuning, 1966
- Tmesisternus prasinatus Heller, 1914
- Tmesisternus pseudintricatus Breuning, 1939
- Tmesisternus pseudirregularis Breuning, 1939
- Tmesisternus pseudissimilis Withaar, 2016
- Tmesisternus pseudohieroglyphicus Breuning, 1939
- Tmesisternus pseudomonticola Breuning, 1939
- Tmesisternus pseudosuperans Breuning, 1939
- Tmesisternus pseudotesselatus Breuning, 1939
- Tmesisternus pseudoviridescens Breuning, 1939
- Tmesisternus pteridophytae Gressitt, 1984
- Tmesisternus pullus Breuning, 1945
- Tmesisternus pulvereoides Breuning, 1975
- Tmesisternus pulvereus Pascoe, 1867
- Tmesisternus quadrimaculatus Aurivillius, 1908
- Tmesisternus quadriplagiatus Breuning, 1939
- Tmesisternus quadripunctatus Gressitt, 1949
- Tmesisternus quadripustulatus Gressitt, 1984
- Tmesisternus quateae Withaar, 2014
- Tmesisternus ramues Withaar, 2016
- Tmesisternus ramues. Withaar, 2018
- Tmesisternus reductus Gressitt, 1984
- Tmesisternus renii Gressitt, 1984
- Tmesisternus replicatus Gressitt, 1984
- Tmesisternus riedeli Weigel, 2004
- Tmesisternus rossi Gressitt, 1984
- Tmesisternus rotundipennis Breuning, 1958
- Tmesisternus ruficornis (Thomson, 1865)
- Tmesisternus rufipes Blanchard, 1853
- Tmesisternus rufotriangularis Gressitt, 1984
- Tmesisternus salomonus (Aurivillius, 1920)
- Tmesisternus samuelsoni Gressitt, 1984
- Tmesisternus schaumii Pascoe, 1867
- Tmesisternus schepmani (Withaar, 2015)
- Tmesisternus schraderi Kreische, 1926
- Tmesisternus schutzei Withaar, 2018
- Tmesisternus sedlaceki Gressitt, 1984
- Tmesisternus semivittatus Breuning, 1945
- Tmesisternus separatus (Aurivillius, 1927)
- Tmesisternus sepicanus (Kreische, 1926)
- Tmesisternus septempunctatus Boisduval, 1835
- Tmesisternus seriemaculatus Breuning, 1939
- Tmesisternus sexcostatus Withaar, 2013
- Tmesisternus sexmaculatus Breuning & de Jong, 1941
- Tmesisternus shanahani Withaar, 2014
- Tmesisternus skalei Weigel, 2018
- Tmesisternus soembanus (Schwarzer, 1931)
- Tmesisternus speciosus Pascoe, 1867
- Tmesisternus stellae Gressitt, 1984
- Tmesisternus strigosus Pascoe, 1867
- Tmesisternus subadspersus Breuning, 1966
- Tmesisternus subalpinus Gressitt, 1984
- Tmesisternus subaureus Gressitt, 1984
- Tmesisternus subbilineatus Breuning, 1966
- Tmesisternus subchlorus (Heller, 1914)
- Tmesisternus subsimilis Breuning, 1966
- Tmesisternus subtriangularis Breuning, 1966
- Tmesisternus subuniformis Gressitt, 1984
- Tmesisternus subvenatus Breuning, 1959
- Tmesisternus subvinculatus Breuning, 1961
- Tmesisternus sulcatellus Breuning, 1984
- Tmesisternus sulcatus Aurivillius, 1911
- Tmesisternus superans (Pascoe, 1868)
- Tmesisternus sylvanicus Gressitt, 1984
- Tmesisternus szentivanyi Gressitt, 1984
- Tmesisternus telnovi Weigel, 2018
- Tmesisternus teragrammus Gilmour, 1950
- Tmesisternus tersus Pascoe, 1862
- Tmesisternus tessellatus Boisduval, 1835
- Tmesisternus testegaus Withaar, 2016
- Tmesisternus timorlautensis Breuning, 1939
- Tmesisternus tolai Gressitt, 1984
- Tmesisternus torridus Pascoe, 1867
- Tmesisternus toxopei Gressitt, 1984
- Tmesisternus transversatus Breuning, 1939
- Tmesisternus transversefasciatus Breuning, 1939
- Tmesisternus transversevittatus Breuning, 1956
- Tmesisternus transversus Pascoe, 1867
- Tmesisternus trapezicollis (Heller, 1914)
- Tmesisternus triangularis Breuning, 1953
- Tmesisternus trilineatus Breuning, 1966
- Tmesisternus ubelsae Withaar, 2016
- Tmesisternus udoschmidti Weigel, 2018
- Tmesisternus unipunctatus Guerin, 1835
- Tmesisternus vagefasciatus Breuning, 1939
- Tmesisternus vagejaspideus Gilmour, 1949
- Tmesisternus vagus (Thomson, 1865)
- Tmesisternus variegatus Gressitt, 1984
- Tmesisternus venatus (Thomson, 1864)
- Tmesisternus villaris Pascoe, 1867
- Tmesisternus vinculatus Heller, 1914
- Tmesisternus virens Gressitt, 1984
- Tmesisternus virescens Breuning, 1939
- Tmesisternus viridescens (Thomson, 1864)
- Tmesisternus viridipennis Breuning, 1940
- Tmesisternus viridis Gestro, 1867
- Tmesisternus wallacei (Pascoe, 1858)
- Tmesisternus wasiorensis Withaar, 2013
- Tmesisternus watutius Withaar, 2016
- Tmesisternus wauensis Gressitt, 1984
- Tmesisternus weigeli Withaar, 2009
- Tmesisternus wiedenfeldi Aurivillius, 1911
- Tmesisternus yokoi Weigel, 2010
- Tmesisternus ziczac Breuning, 1939
