= Tmesisternus keitocali =

Scientific classification
- Kingdom: Animalia
- Phylum: Arthropoda
- Class: Insecta
- Order: Coleoptera
- Suborder: Polyphaga
- Infraorder: Cucujiformia
- Family: Cerambycidae
- Genus: Tmesisternus
- Species: T. keitocali

Binomial name
- Tmesisternus keitocali Breuning, 1972

Species of beetle

Tmesisternus keitocali is a species of beetle in the family Cerambycidae.
