= Tmesisternus bezarki =

Scientific classification
- Domain: Eukaryota
- Kingdom: Animalia
- Phylum: Arthropoda
- Class: Insecta
- Order: Coleoptera
- Suborder: Polyphaga
- Infraorder: Cucujiformia
- Family: Cerambycidae
- Genus: Tmesisternus
- Species: T. bezarki

Binomial name
- Tmesisternus bezarki Weigel, 2006

Species of beetle

Tmesisternus bezarki is a species of beetle in the family Cerambycidae.
