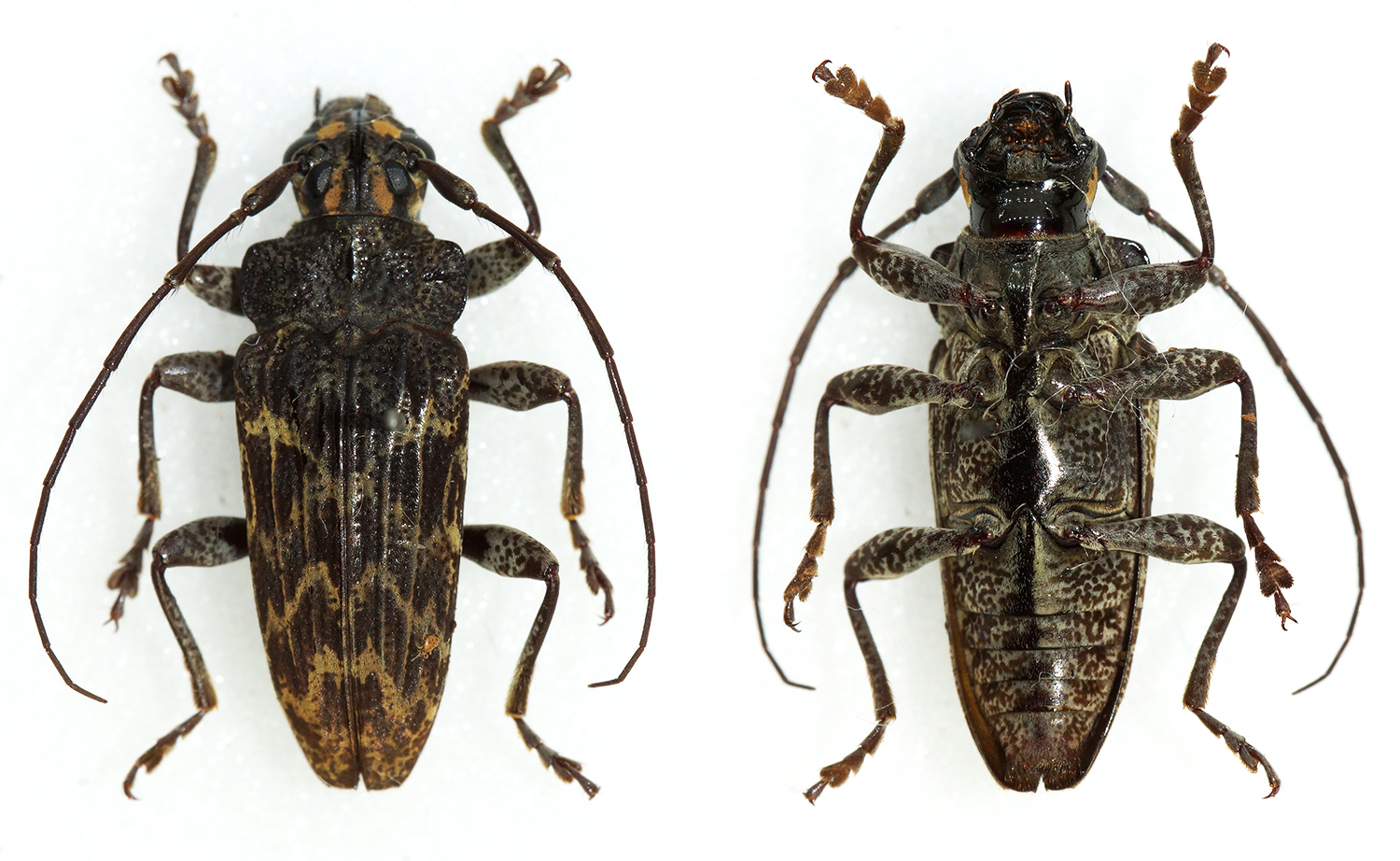

Scientific classification
- Domain: Eukaryota
- Kingdom: Animalia
- Phylum: Arthropoda
- Class: Insecta
- Order: Coleoptera
- Suborder: Polyphaga
- Infraorder: Cucujiformia
- Family: Cerambycidae
- Genus: Tmesisternus
- Species: T. jaspideus

Binomial name
- Tmesisternus jaspideus Boisduval, 1835

= Tmesisternus jaspideus =

Species of beetle

Tmesisternus jaspideus is a species of beetle in the family Cerambycidae. It was first described by Jean Baptiste Boisduval in 1835.

== Subspecies ==
- Tmesisternus sulcatipennis Blanchard, 1853
- Tmesisternus flexiosa Pascoe, 1867
