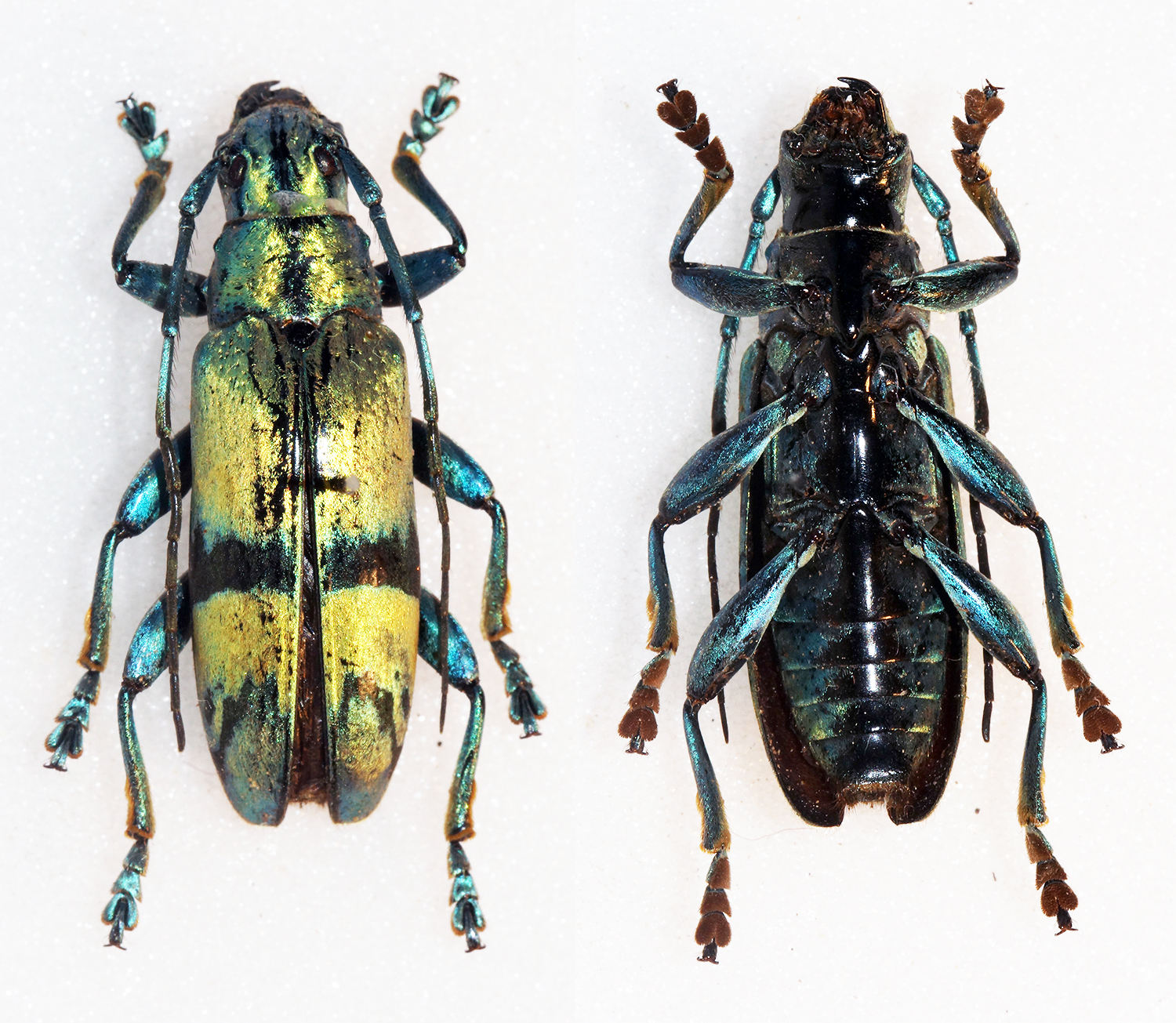

Scientific classification
- Domain: Eukaryota
- Kingdom: Animalia
- Phylum: Arthropoda
- Class: Insecta
- Order: Coleoptera
- Suborder: Polyphaga
- Infraorder: Cucujiformia
- Family: Cerambycidae
- Genus: Tmesisternus
- Species: T. isabellae

Binomial name
- Tmesisternus isabellae Snellen van Vollenhoven, 1871

= Tmesisternus isabellae =

Species of beetle

Tmesisternus isabellae is a species of beetle in the family Cerambycidae. It was described by Snellen van Vollenhoven in 1871. It is known from Papua New Guinea and Indonesia.
