= Tmesisternus lictorius =

Scientific classification
- Domain: Eukaryota
- Kingdom: Animalia
- Phylum: Arthropoda
- Class: Insecta
- Order: Coleoptera
- Suborder: Polyphaga
- Infraorder: Cucujiformia
- Family: Cerambycidae
- Genus: Tmesisternus
- Species: T. lictorius

Binomial name
- Tmesisternus lictorius (Pascoe, 1867)

Synonyms
- Polyxo lictoria Pascoe, 1867

Species of beetle

Tmesisternus lictorius is a species of beetle in the family Cerambycidae. It was described by Francis Polkinghorne Pascoe in 1867.
