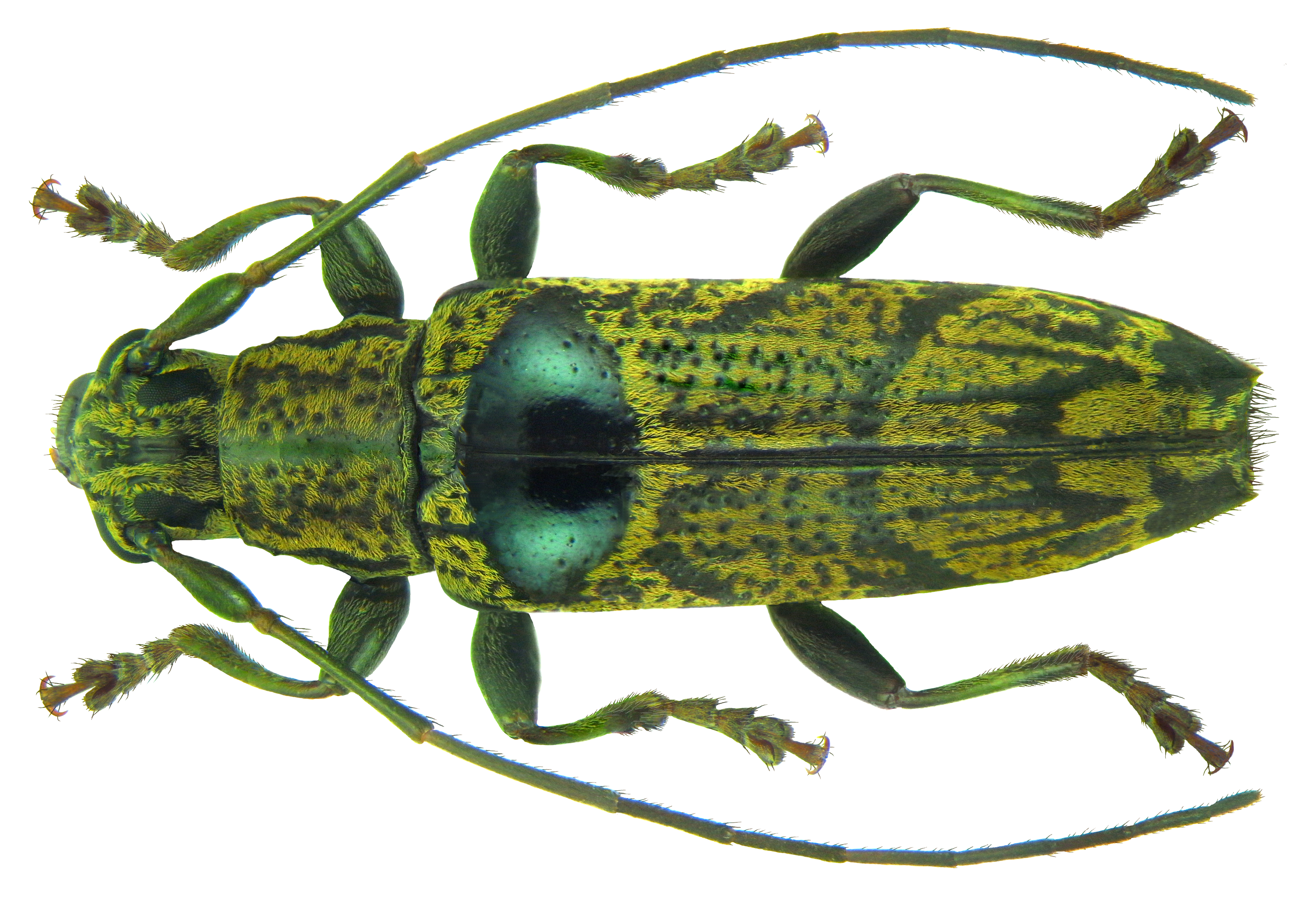
- Tmesisternus transversus (female)

Scientific classification
- Kingdom: Animalia
- Phylum: Arthropoda
- Class: Insecta
- Order: Coleoptera
- Suborder: Polyphaga
- Infraorder: Cucujiformia
- Family: Cerambycidae
- Genus: Tmesisternus
- Species: T. transversus

Binomial name
- Tmesisternus transversus Pascoe, 1867

= Tmesisternus transversus =

Species of beetle

Tmesisternus transversus is a species of beetle in the family Cerambycidae. It was first described by Francis Polkinghorne Pascoe in 1867. It is known from Moluccas.
