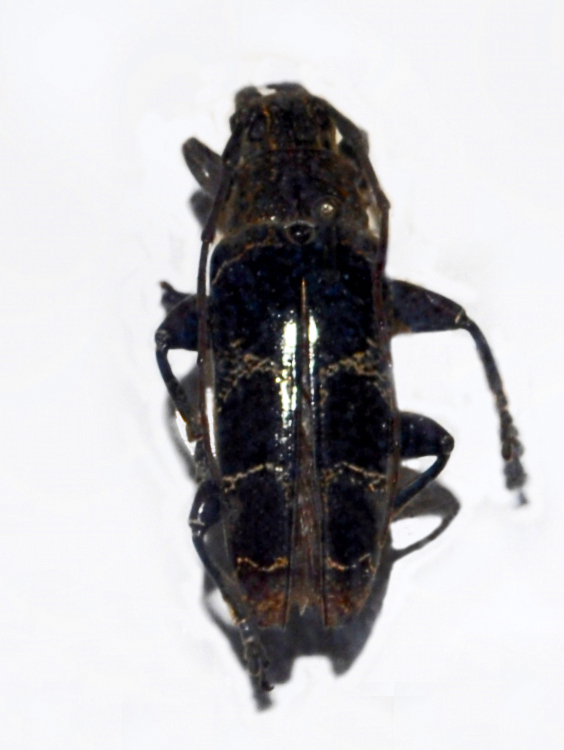
- Tmesisternus politus. Mounted specimen.

Scientific classification
- Kingdom: Animalia
- Phylum: Arthropoda
- Class: Insecta
- Order: Coleoptera
- Suborder: Polyphaga
- Infraorder: Cucujiformia
- Family: Cerambycidae
- Genus: Tmesisternus
- Species: T. politus

Binomial name
- Tmesisternus politus Blanchard, 1853

Synonyms
- Tmesisternus aruensis Gahan, 1916; Tmesisternus dejeani Montrouzier, 1855; Tmesisternus equestris Pascoe, 1867

= Tmesisternus politus =

Species of beetle

Tmesisternus politus is a species of longhorn beetles belonging to the family Cerambycidae, subfamily Lamiinae.

== Distribution ==
This species can be found in Papua New Guinea and the Aru Islands.
