= Tmesisternus papuanus =

Scientific classification
- Kingdom: Animalia
- Phylum: Arthropoda
- Class: Insecta
- Order: Coleoptera
- Suborder: Polyphaga
- Infraorder: Cucujiformia
- Family: Cerambycidae
- Genus: Tmesisternus
- Species: T. papuanus

Binomial name
- Tmesisternus papuanus Breuning, 1945

Synonyms
- Tmesisternopsis papuanus (Breuning, 1945)

Species of beetle

Tmesisternus papuanus is a species of beetle in the family Cerambycidae. It was described by Stephan von Breuning in 1945.
