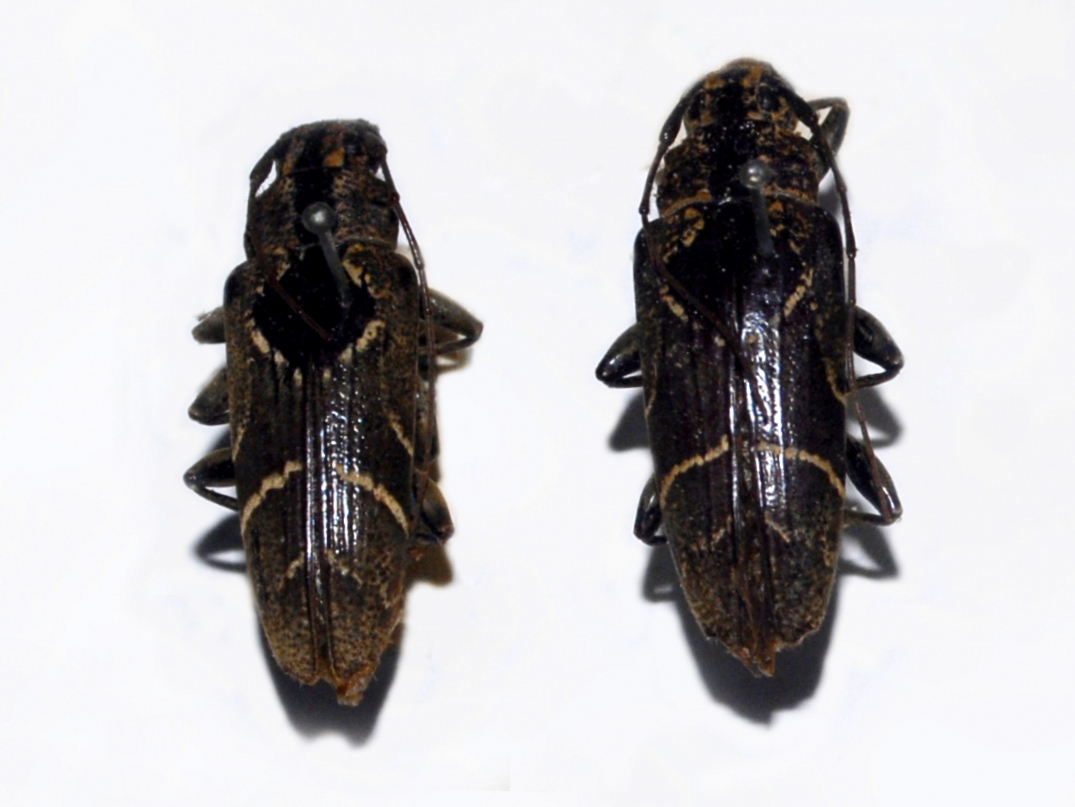
- Tmesisternus adspersus. Mounted specimen

Scientific classification
- Domain: Eukaryota
- Kingdom: Animalia
- Phylum: Arthropoda
- Class: Insecta
- Order: Coleoptera
- Suborder: Polyphaga
- Infraorder: Cucujiformia
- Family: Cerambycidae
- Genus: Tmesisternus
- Species: T. adspersus

Binomial name
- Tmesisternus adspersus Blanchard, 1853

Synonyms
- Tmesisternus marmoratus Blanchard, 1842; Tmesisternus patricia Pascoe, 1867; Tmesisternus patricius Thomson, 1865

= Tmesisternus adspersus =

Species of beetle

Tmesisternus adspersus is a species of longhorn beetles belonging to the family Cerambycidae, subfamily Lamiinae.

== Distribution ==
This species can be found in Papua New Guinea and adjacent islands.
