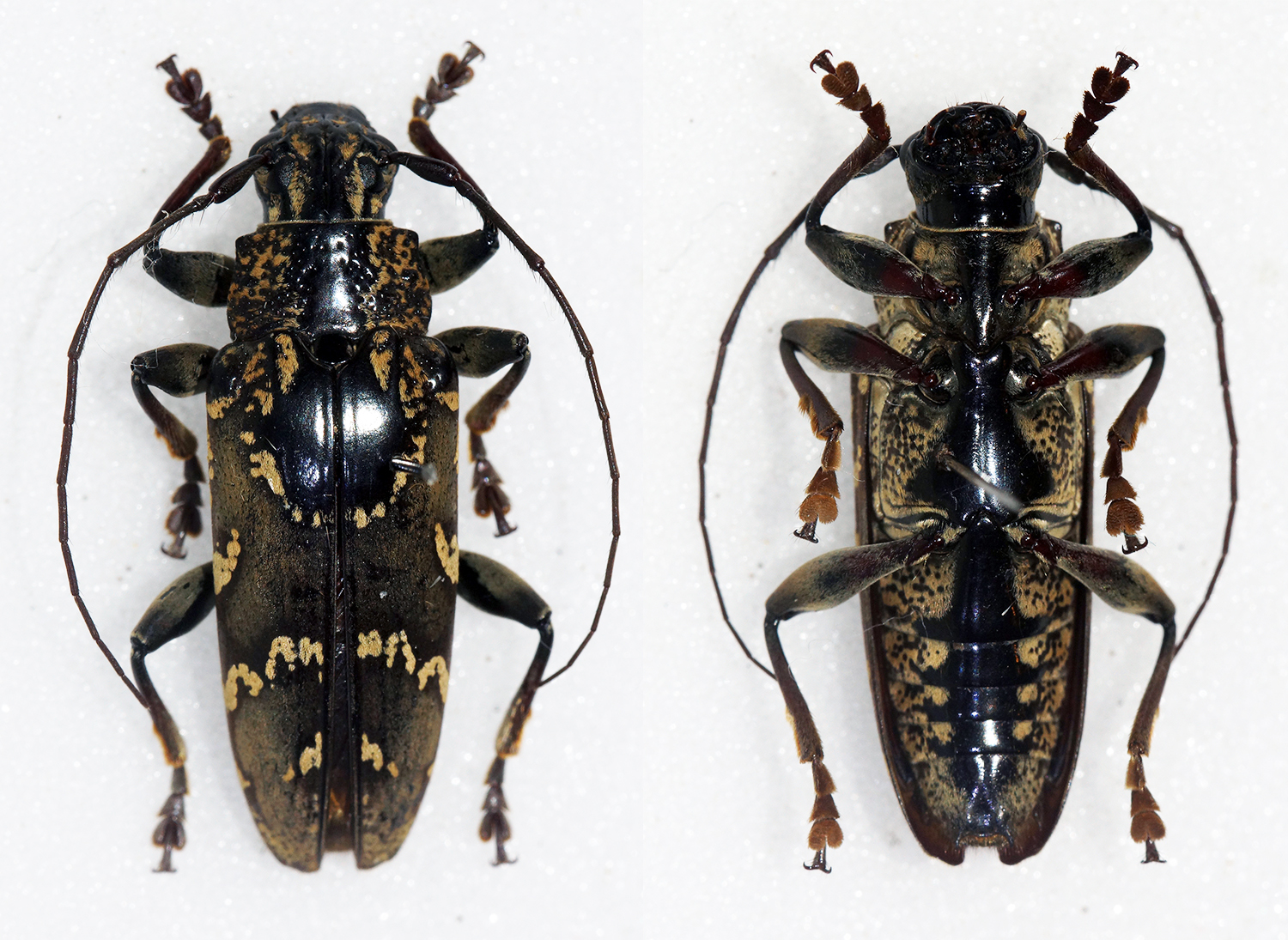

Scientific classification
- Kingdom: Animalia
- Phylum: Arthropoda
- Class: Insecta
- Order: Coleoptera
- Suborder: Polyphaga
- Infraorder: Cucujiformia
- Family: Cerambycidae
- Genus: Tmesisternus
- Species: T. adspersarius

Binomial name
- Tmesisternus adspersarius Breuning, 1939

= Tmesisternus adspersarius =

Species of beetle

Tmesisternus adspersarius is a species of beetle in the family Cerambycidae. This species was described by Stephan von Breuning in 1939 as part of his extensive work on the systematics of Cerambycidae beetles, particularly within the Tmesisternini tribe, highlighting its placement within the larger framework of longhorn beetle diversity.
