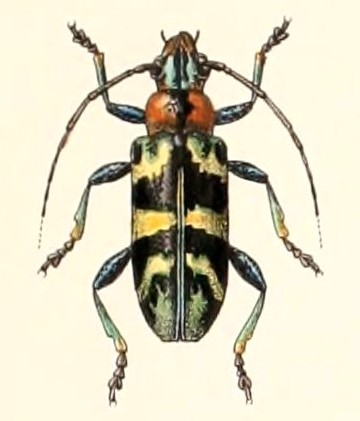

Scientific classification
- Domain: Eukaryota
- Kingdom: Animalia
- Phylum: Arthropoda
- Class: Insecta
- Order: Coleoptera
- Suborder: Polyphaga
- Infraorder: Cucujiformia
- Family: Cerambycidae
- Genus: Tmesisternus
- Species: T. dohertyi

Binomial name
- Tmesisternus dohertyi Jordan, 1894

= Tmesisternus dohertyi =

Species of beetle

Tmesisternus dohertyi is a species of beetle in the family Cerambycidae. It was described by Karl Jordan in 1894. It is known from Papua New Guinea and Indonesia.
