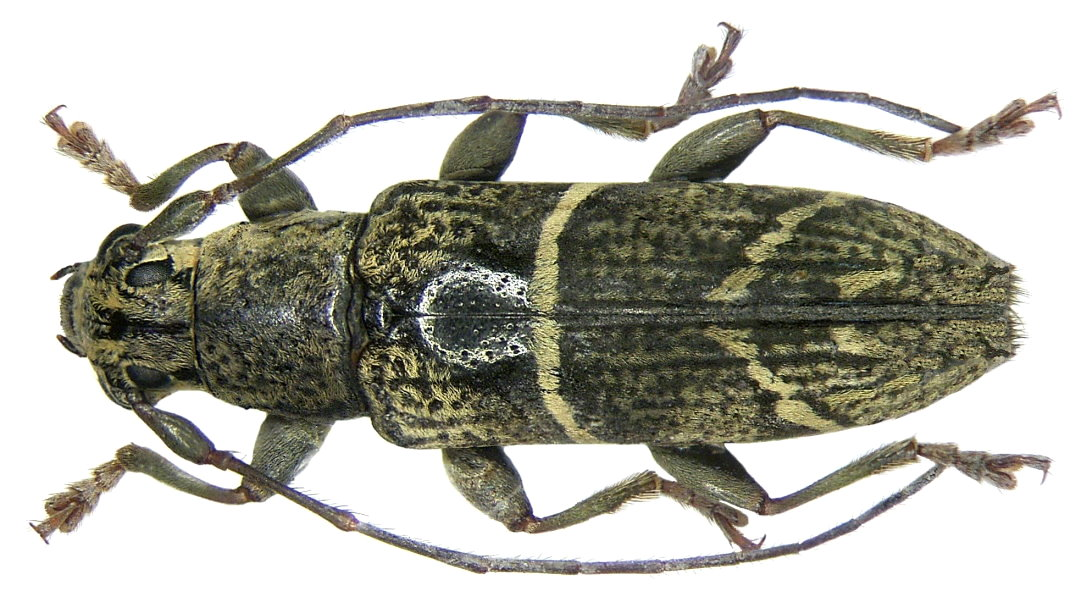

Scientific classification
- Domain: Eukaryota
- Kingdom: Animalia
- Phylum: Arthropoda
- Class: Insecta
- Order: Coleoptera
- Suborder: Polyphaga
- Infraorder: Cucujiformia
- Family: Cerambycidae
- Genus: Tmesisternus
- Species: T. oblongus

Binomial name
- Tmesisternus oblongus Boisduval, 1835

Synonyms
- Tmesisternus analis Pascoe, 1867; Tmesisternus agnatus Pascoe, 1867; Tmesisternus rugosicollis Blanchard, 1853

= Tmesisternus oblongus =

Species of beetle

Tmesisternus oblongus is a species of beetle in the family Cerambycidae. It was described by Jean Baptiste Boisduval in 1835. It is known from Indonesia.
