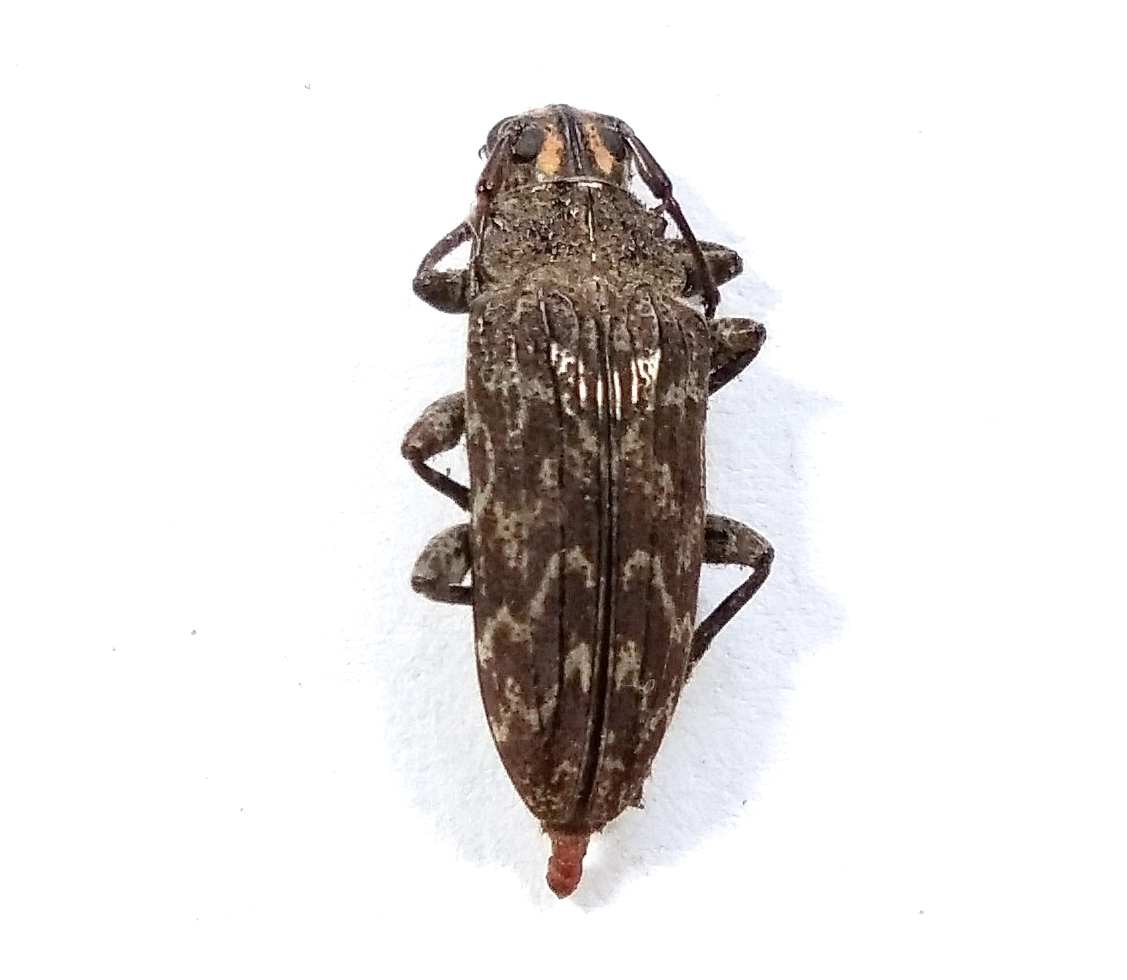

Scientific classification
- Domain: Eukaryota
- Kingdom: Animalia
- Phylum: Arthropoda
- Class: Insecta
- Order: Coleoptera
- Suborder: Polyphaga
- Infraorder: Cucujiformia
- Family: Cerambycidae
- Genus: Tmesisternus
- Species: T. canofasciatus

Binomial name
- Tmesisternus canofasciatus (Aurivillius, 1927)

= Tmesisternus canofasciatus =

Species of beetle

Tmesisternus canofasciatus is a species of beetle in the family Cerambycidae, that was first described by the Swedish entomologist Per Olof Christopher Aurivillius in 1927. It was discovered in Papua New Guinea.
