= Tmesisternus bruijni =

Scientific classification
- Domain: Eukaryota
- Kingdom: Animalia
- Phylum: Arthropoda
- Class: Insecta
- Order: Coleoptera
- Suborder: Polyphaga
- Infraorder: Cucujiformia
- Family: Cerambycidae
- Genus: Tmesisternus
- Species: T. bruijni

Binomial name
- Tmesisternus bruijni Gestro, 1876

Species of beetle

Tmesisternus bruijni is a species of beetle in the family Cerambycidae.
