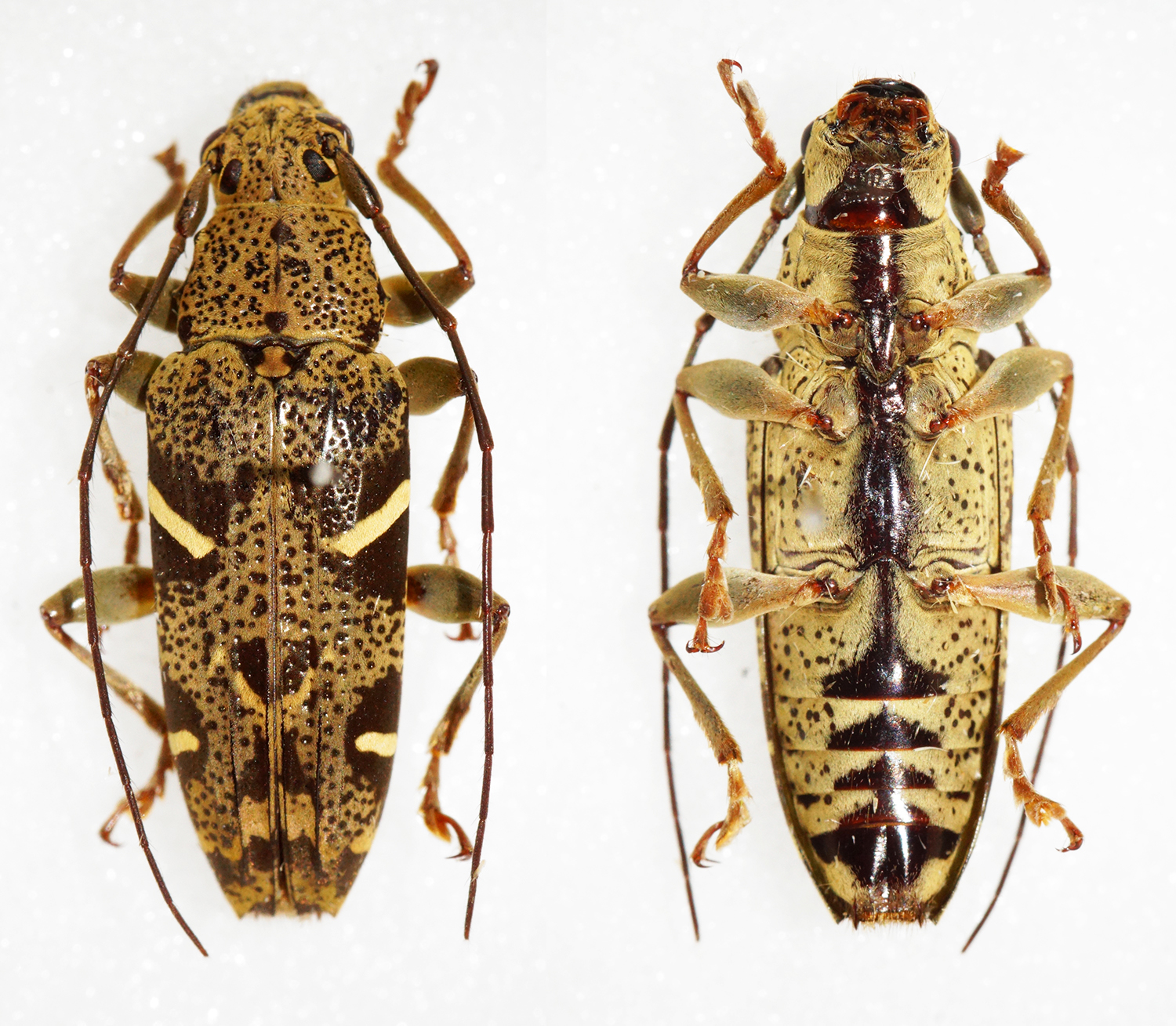

Scientific classification
- Domain: Eukaryota
- Kingdom: Animalia
- Phylum: Arthropoda
- Class: Insecta
- Order: Coleoptera
- Suborder: Polyphaga
- Infraorder: Cucujiformia
- Family: Cerambycidae
- Genus: Tmesisternus
- Species: T. dissimilis

Binomial name
- Tmesisternus dissimilis Pascoe, 1867

Synonyms
- Tmesisternus subcinctus Gestro, 1876

= Tmesisternus dissimilis =

Species of beetle

Tmesisternus dissimilis is a species of beetle in the family Cerambycidae. It was described by Francis Polkinghorne Pascoe in 1867.
