= Tmesisternus bilaterimaculatus =

Scientific classification
- Kingdom: Animalia
- Phylum: Arthropoda
- Class: Insecta
- Order: Coleoptera
- Suborder: Polyphaga
- Infraorder: Cucujiformia
- Family: Cerambycidae
- Genus: Tmesisternus
- Species: T. bilaterimaculatus

Binomial name
- Tmesisternus bilaterimaculatus Breuning, 1966

Species of beetle

Tmesisternus bilaterimaculatus is a species of beetle in the family Cerambycidae. It was described by Stephan von Breuning in 1966.
