= Tmesisternus brevespinosus =

Scientific classification
- Kingdom: Animalia
- Phylum: Arthropoda
- Class: Insecta
- Order: Coleoptera
- Suborder: Polyphaga
- Infraorder: Cucujiformia
- Family: Cerambycidae
- Genus: Tmesisternus
- Species: T. brevespinosus

Binomial name
- Tmesisternus brevespinosus Breuning & De Jong, 1941

Synonyms
- Tmesisternus brevespinosus Breuning & de Jong, 1941

Species of beetle

Tmesisternus brevespinosus is a species of beetle in the family Cerambycidae. It was described by Von Breuning and De Jong in 1941. It is known from Papua New Guinea.
