= Sphecozone =

Scientific classification
- Kingdom: Animalia
- Phylum: Arthropoda
- Subphylum: Chelicerata
- Class: Arachnida
- Order: Araneae
- Infraorder: Araneomorphae
- Family: Linyphiidae
- Genus: Sphecozone; O. Pickard-Cambridge, 1871

Type species
- S. rubescens O. Pickard-Cambridge, 1871

Species
- 34, see text

Synonyms
- Brattia Simon, 1894; Clitolyna Simon, 1894; Gymnocymbium Millidge, 1991; Hypselistoides Tullgren, 1901

Genus of spiders

Sphecozone is a genus of sheet weavers that was first described by Octavius Pickard-Cambridge in 1871.

== Species ==
As of May 2019 it contains thirty-four species, found in South America, the United States, and on the Trinidad:

- Sphecozone altehabitans (Keyserling, 1886) – Peru
- Sphecozone alticeps Millidge, 1991 – Colombia
- Sphecozone araeonciformis (Simon, 1895) – Argentina
- Sphecozone bicolor (Nicolet, 1849) – Chile, Argentina
- Sphecozone capitata Millidge, 1991 – Peru
- Sphecozone castanea (Millidge, 1991) – Brazil
- Sphecozone corniculans Millidge, 1991 – Colombia
- Sphecozone cornuta Millidge, 1991 – Argentina
- Sphecozone crassa (Millidge, 1991) – Colombia, Brazil
- Sphecozone crinita Millidge, 1991 – Ecuador
- Sphecozone diversicolor (Keyserling, 1886) – Brazil, Argentina
- Sphecozone fastibilis (Keyserling, 1886) – Brazil, Argentina
- Sphecozone formosa (Millidge, 1991) – Ecuador
- Sphecozone gravis (Millidge, 1991) – Bolivia
- Sphecozone ignigena (Keyserling, 1886) – Brazil, Argentina
- Sphecozone labiata (Keyserling, 1886) – Brazil
- Sphecozone lobata Millidge, 1991 – Chile (Juan Fernandez Is.)
- Sphecozone longipes (Strand, 1908) – Peru
- Sphecozone magnipalpis Millidge, 1993 – USA
- Sphecozone melanocephala (Millidge, 1991) – Brazil
- Sphecozone modesta (Nicolet, 1849) – Bolivia, Brazil, Chile, Argentina
- Sphecozone modica Millidge, 1991 – Argentina
- Sphecozone nigripes Millidge, 1991 – Peru
- Sphecozone nitens Millidge, 1991 – Ecuador, Peru
- Sphecozone niwina (Chamberlin, 1916) – Peru, Bolivia, Chile
- Sphecozone novaeteutoniae (Baert, 1987) – Brazil
- Sphecozone personata (Simon, 1894) – Brazil
- Sphecozone rostrata Millidge, 1991 – Brazil
- Sphecozone rubescens O. Pickard-Cambridge, 1871 (type) – Brazil, Paraguay, Argentina
- Sphecozone rubicunda (Keyserling, 1886) – Peru
- Sphecozone spadicaria (Simon, 1894) – Colombia, Trinidad, Venezuela
- Sphecozone tumidosa (Keyserling, 1886) – Brazil, Argentina
- Sphecozone varia Millidge, 1991 – Peru
- Sphecozone venialis (Keyserling, 1886) – Brazil, Argentina
