= Glenea funerula =

Scientific classification
- Kingdom: Animalia
- Phylum: Arthropoda
- Clade: Pancrustacea
- Class: Insecta
- Order: Coleoptera
- Suborder: Polyphaga
- Infraorder: Cucujiformia
- Family: Cerambycidae
- Genus: Glenea
- Species: G. funerula

Binomial name
- Glenea funerula (J. Thomson, 1857)

Synonyms
- Stibara funerula J. Thomson, 1857

Species of beetle

Glenea funerula is a species of beetle in the family Cerambycidae. It was described by James Thomson in 1857. It is known from Sumatra, India, Malaysia, and Java.

== Subspecies ==
- Glenea funerula funerula (J. Thomson, 1857)
- Glenea funerula javana (Pic, 1946)
