= Apatelarthron =

Scientific classification
- Kingdom: Animalia
- Phylum: Arthropoda
- Class: Insecta
- Order: Coleoptera
- Suborder: Polyphaga
- Infraorder: Cucujiformia
- Family: Cerambycidae
- Subfamily: Lamiinae
- Tribe: Pteropliini
- Genus: Apatelarthron; Thomson, 1864
- Species: A. heteroclitum

Binomial name
- Apatelarthron heteroclitum Thomson, 1864

Genus of beetles

Apatelarthron is a genus of beetles in the family Cerambycidae. It originally contained only one species, Apatelarthron heteroclitum, described by James Thomson in 1864, but two more were added in 2021.
