= Dorcadion niveisparsum =

Scientific classification
- Kingdom: Animalia
- Phylum: Arthropoda
- Clade: Pancrustacea
- Class: Insecta
- Order: Coleoptera
- Suborder: Polyphaga
- Infraorder: Cucujiformia
- Family: Cerambycidae
- Genus: Dorcadion
- Species: D. niveisparsum

Binomial name
- Dorcadion niveisparsum Thomson, 1865

Species of beetle

Dorcadion niveisparsum is a species of beetle in the family Cerambycidae. It was described by James Thomson in 1865. It is known from Turkey and Armenia.
