= Glenea voluptuosa =

Scientific classification
- Domain: Eukaryota
- Kingdom: Animalia
- Phylum: Arthropoda
- Class: Insecta
- Order: Coleoptera
- Suborder: Polyphaga
- Infraorder: Cucujiformia
- Family: Cerambycidae
- Genus: Glenea
- Species: G. voluptuosa

Binomial name
- Glenea voluptuosa Thomson, 1860

Species of beetle

Glenea voluptuosa is a species of beetle in the family Cerambycidae. It was described by James Thomson in 1860.

== Subspecies ==
- Glenea voluptuosa thetis J. Thomson, 1879
- Glenea voluptuosa voluptuosa Thomson, 1860
