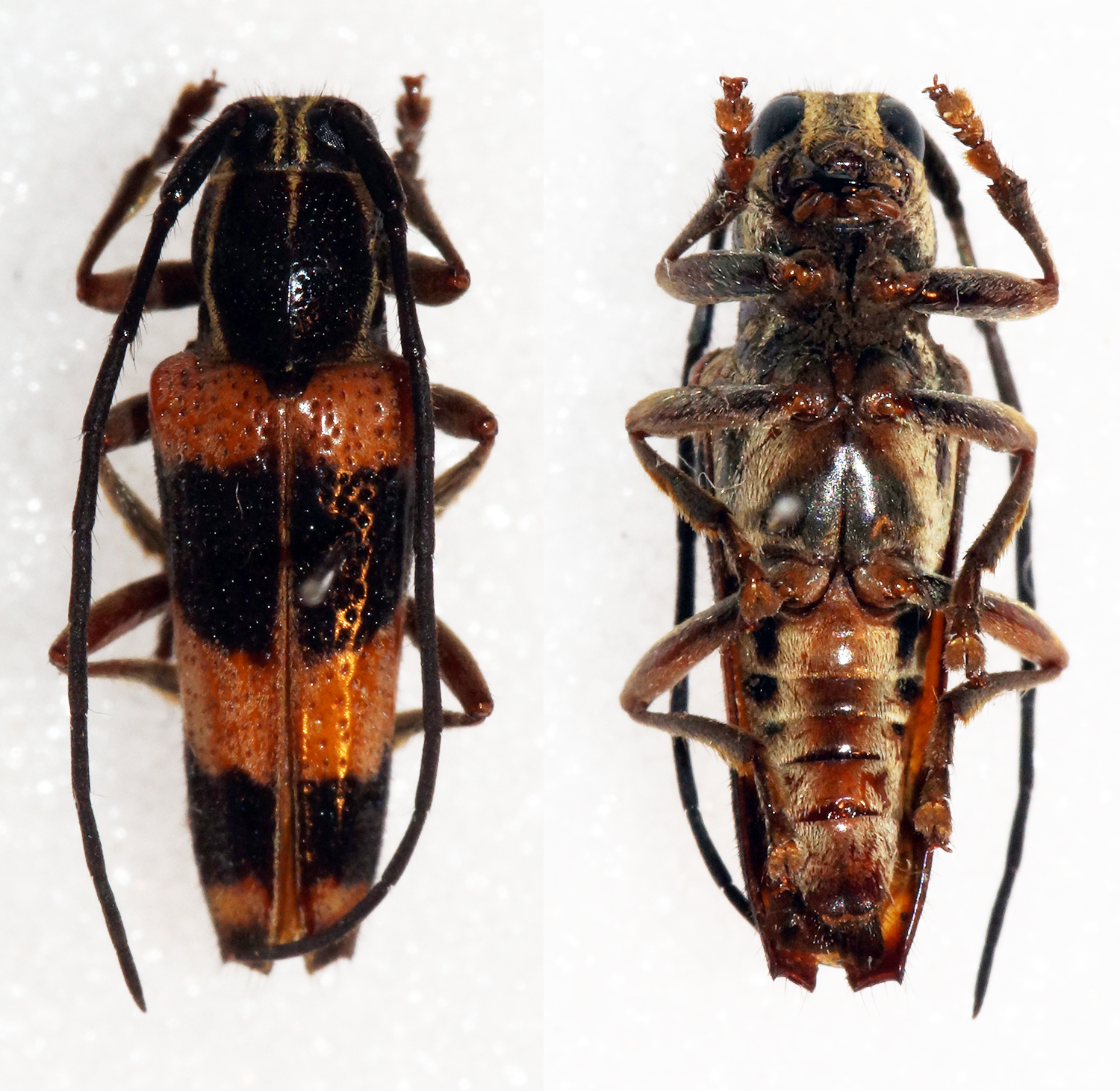

Scientific classification
- Domain: Eukaryota
- Kingdom: Animalia
- Phylum: Arthropoda
- Class: Insecta
- Order: Coleoptera
- Suborder: Polyphaga
- Infraorder: Cucujiformia
- Family: Cerambycidae
- Genus: Glenea
- Species: G. gabonica

Binomial name
- Glenea gabonica (Thomson, 1858)

Synonyms
- Sphenura gabonica Thomson, 1858

= Glenea gabonica =

Species of beetle

Glenea gabonica is a species of beetle in the family Cerambycidae. It was described by James Thomson in 1858. It is known from the Democratic Republic of the Congo, Cameroon, and Gabon. It contains the varietas Glenea gabonica var. cana.
