= Glenea saperdoides =

Scientific classification
- Domain: Eukaryota
- Kingdom: Animalia
- Phylum: Arthropoda
- Class: Insecta
- Order: Coleoptera
- Suborder: Polyphaga
- Infraorder: Cucujiformia
- Family: Cerambycidae
- Genus: Glenea
- Species: G. saperdoides

Binomial name
- Glenea saperdoides J. Thomson, 1860

Species of beetle

Glenea saperdoides is a species of beetle in the family Cerambycidae. It was described by James Thomson in 1860. The species is further divided into 4 subspecies, and is found in the Indian subcontinent and south east Asia.

== Subspecies ==
- Glenea saperdoides javicola Breuning, 1956
- Glenea saperdoides saperdoides J. Thomson, 1860
- Glenea saperdoides tamborana Breuning, 1956
- Glenea saperdoides vientianensis Pic, 1926
