= Pterolophia biarcuata =

Scientific classification
- Kingdom: Animalia
- Phylum: Arthropoda
- Clade: Pancrustacea
- Class: Insecta
- Order: Coleoptera
- Suborder: Polyphaga
- Infraorder: Cucujiformia
- Family: Cerambycidae
- Genus: Pterolophia
- Species: P. biarcuata

Binomial name
- Pterolophia biarcuata (Thomson, 1858)

Synonyms
- Theticus biarcuatus Thomson, 1858

Species of beetle

Pterolophia biarcuata is a species of beetle in the family Cerambycidae. It was described by James Thomson in 1858. It has a wide distribution in Africa.
