= Glenea interrupta =

Scientific classification
- Domain: Eukaryota
- Kingdom: Animalia
- Phylum: Arthropoda
- Class: Insecta
- Order: Coleoptera
- Suborder: Polyphaga
- Infraorder: Cucujiformia
- Family: Cerambycidae
- Genus: Glenea
- Species: G. interrupta

Binomial name
- Glenea interrupta Thomson, 1860

Synonyms
- Glenea boisduvalii Thomson, 1865

Species of beetle

Glenea interrupta is a species of beetle in the family Cerambycidae. It was described by James Thomson in 1860.

== Subspecies ==
- Glenea interrupta densepunctata Breuning, 1958
- Glenea interrupta interrupta Thomson, 1860
