= Glenea sanctaemariae =

Scientific classification
- Domain: Eukaryota
- Kingdom: Animalia
- Phylum: Arthropoda
- Class: Insecta
- Order: Coleoptera
- Suborder: Polyphaga
- Infraorder: Cucujiformia
- Family: Cerambycidae
- Genus: Glenea
- Species: G. sanctaemariae

Binomial name
- Glenea sanctaemariae (Thomson, 1857)

Species of beetle

Glenea sanctaemariae is a species of beetle in the family Cerambycidae that lives in Bangladesh and India. It was described by James Thomson in 1857.
