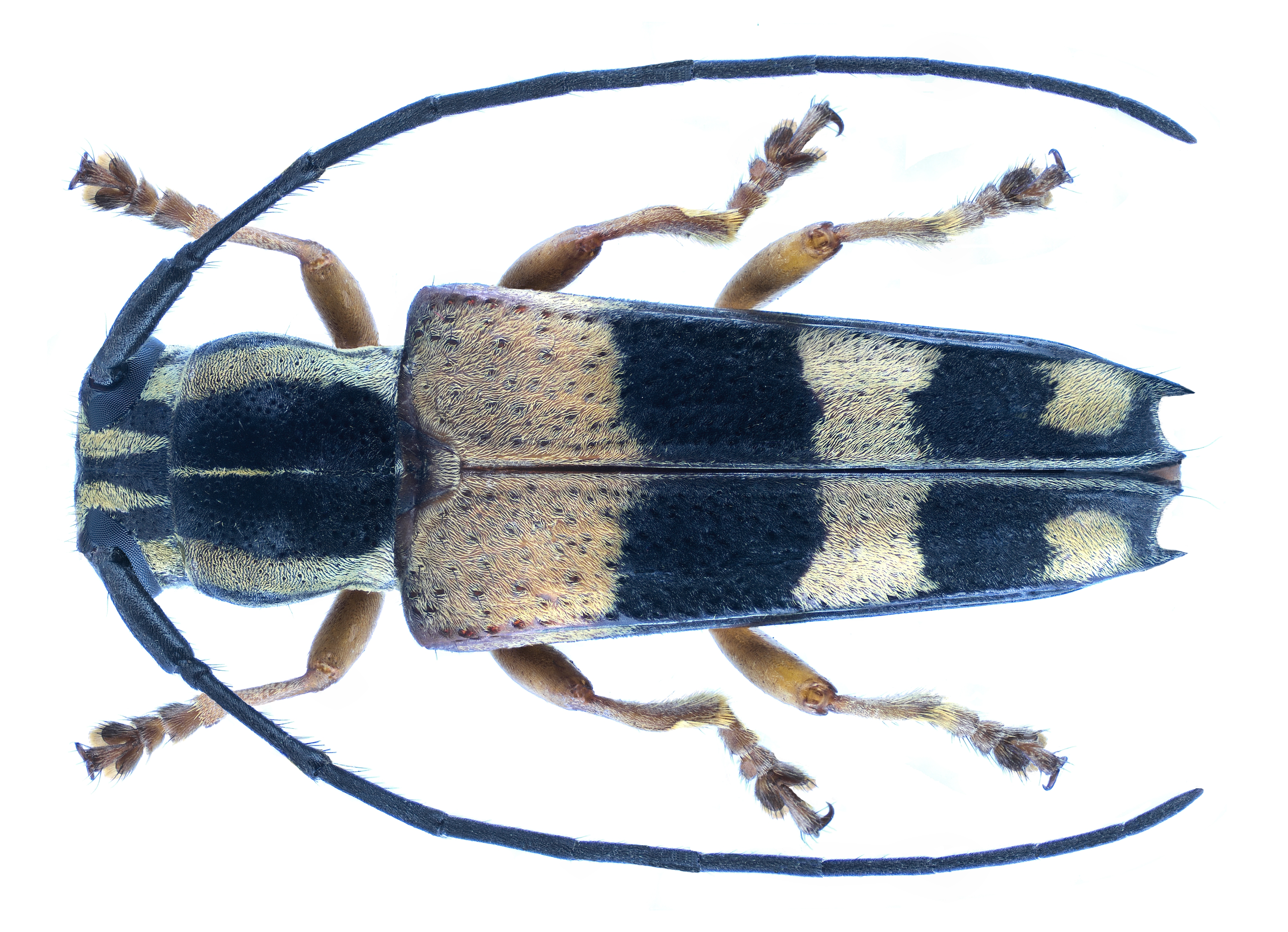
- Glenea adelpha

Scientific classification
- Domain: Eukaryota
- Kingdom: Animalia
- Phylum: Arthropoda
- Class: Insecta
- Order: Coleoptera
- Suborder: Polyphaga
- Infraorder: Cucujiformia
- Family: Cerambycidae
- Genus: Glenea
- Species: G. adelpha

Binomial name
- Glenea adelpha (Thomson, 1858)

= Glenea adelpha =

Species of beetle

Glenea adelpha is a species of beetle in the family Cerambycidae. It was described by James Thomson in 1858. It is found in the tropical forests of west central Africa including Cameroon.
