= Glenea illuminata =

Scientific classification
- Domain: Eukaryota
- Kingdom: Animalia
- Phylum: Arthropoda
- Class: Insecta
- Order: Coleoptera
- Suborder: Polyphaga
- Infraorder: Cucujiformia
- Family: Cerambycidae
- Genus: Glenea
- Species: G. illuminata

Binomial name
- Glenea illuminata (Thomson, 1857)

Synonyms
- Stibara illuminata Thomson, 1857

Species of beetle

Glenea illuminata is a species of beetle in the family Cerambycidae. It was described by James Thomson in 1857. It is known from Singapore.
