= Tmesisternus conicicollis =

Scientific classification
- Domain: Eukaryota
- Kingdom: Animalia
- Phylum: Arthropoda
- Class: Insecta
- Order: Coleoptera
- Suborder: Polyphaga
- Infraorder: Cucujiformia
- Family: Cerambycidae
- Genus: Tmesisternus
- Species: T. conicicollis

Binomial name
- Tmesisternus conicicollis James Thomson

Synonyms
- Tmesisternus strandi Breuning, 1939; Tmesisternus curtulus Breuning, 1966; Tmesisternus humboldti Gilmour, 1949; Tmesisternus subcurtulus Breuning, 1966; Apolia conicicollis Thomson, 1864

Species of beetle

Tmesisternus conicicollis is a species of beetle in the family Cerambycidae. It was described by James Thomson in 1864.

It is 10 mm long and 3.7 mm wide. Its junior synonym, T. strandi was named in honor of Embrik Strand, in whose Festschrift the species description was written.
