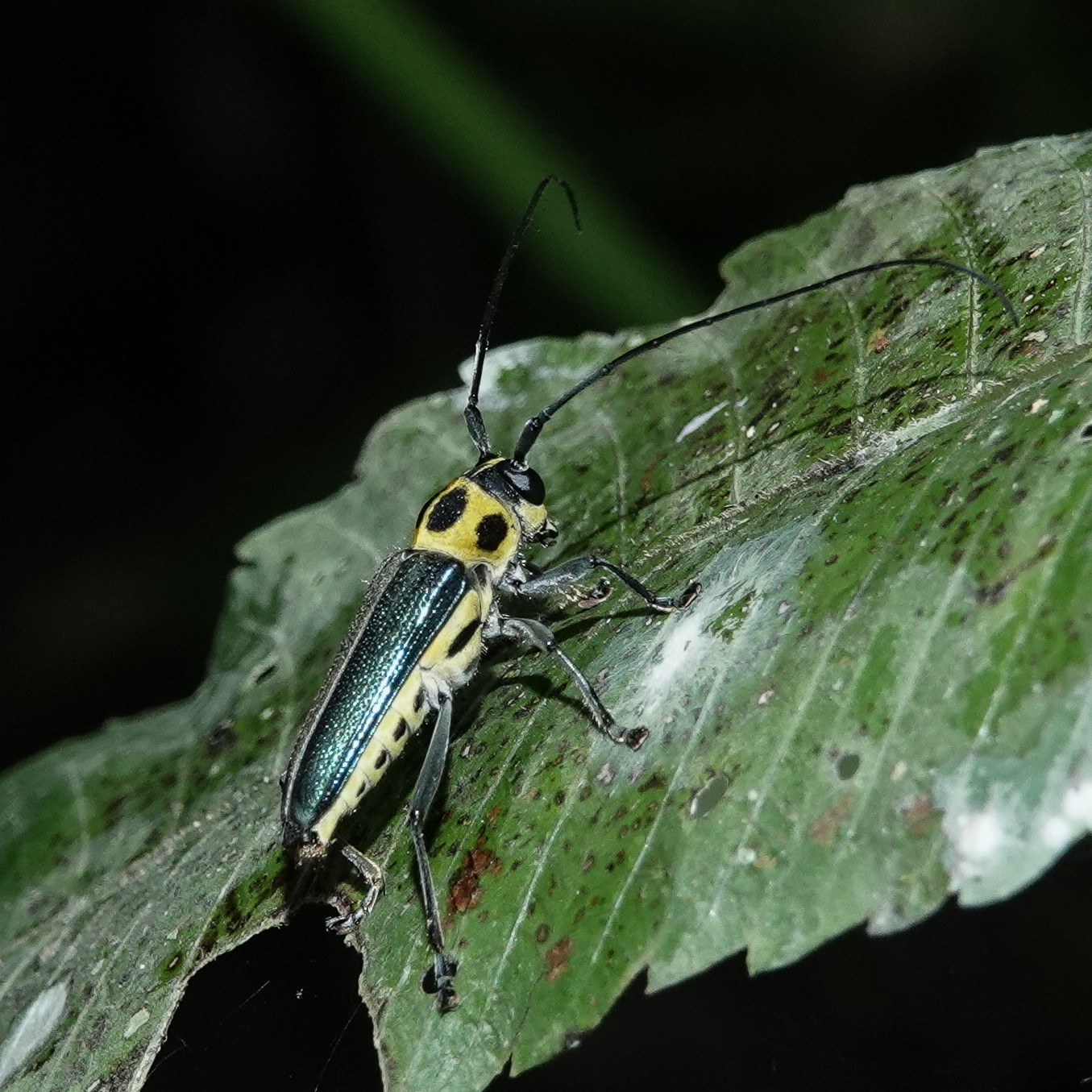

Scientific classification
- Kingdom: Animalia
- Phylum: Arthropoda
- Clade: Pancrustacea
- Class: Insecta
- Order: Coleoptera
- Suborder: Polyphaga
- Infraorder: Cucujiformia
- Family: Cerambycidae
- Genus: Glenea
- Species: G. chalybeata

Binomial name
- Glenea chalybeata Thomson, 1860

= Glenea chalybeata =

Species of beetle

Glenea chalybeata is a species of beetle in the family Cerambycidae. It was first described by James Thomson in 1860.
