= Cenodocus antennatus =

Scientific classification
- Kingdom: Animalia
- Phylum: Arthropoda
- Clade: Pancrustacea
- Class: Insecta
- Order: Coleoptera
- Suborder: Polyphaga
- Infraorder: Cucujiformia
- Family: Cerambycidae
- Genus: Cenodocus
- Species: C. antennatus

Binomial name
- Cenodocus antennatus J. Thomson, 1864

Synonyms
- Cenodocus adustus Pascoe, 1865

Species of beetle

Cenodocus antennatus is a species of beetle in the family Cerambycidae. It was described by James Thomson in 1864. It is known from Malaysia, Java, Borneo, Laos and Sumatra.
