= Glenea strigata =

Scientific classification
- Kingdom: Animalia
- Phylum: Arthropoda
- Clade: Pancrustacea
- Class: Insecta
- Order: Coleoptera
- Suborder: Polyphaga
- Infraorder: Cucujiformia
- Family: Cerambycidae
- Genus: Glenea
- Species: G. strigata

Binomial name
- Glenea strigata Thomson, 1860

Species of beetle

Glenea strigata is a species of beetle in the family Cerambycidae. It was described by James Thomson in 1860.
