= Glenea niobe =

Scientific classification
- Kingdom: Animalia
- Phylum: Arthropoda
- Class: Insecta
- Order: Coleoptera
- Suborder: Polyphaga
- Infraorder: Cucujiformia
- Family: Cerambycidae
- Genus: Glenea
- Species: G. niobe

Binomial name
- Glenea niobe J. Thomson, 1879

Synonyms
- Glenea biocellata Breuning, 1956

Species of beetle

Glenea niobe is a species of beetle in the family Cerambycidae. It was described by James Thomson in 1879. It is known from Burma and Borneo.
