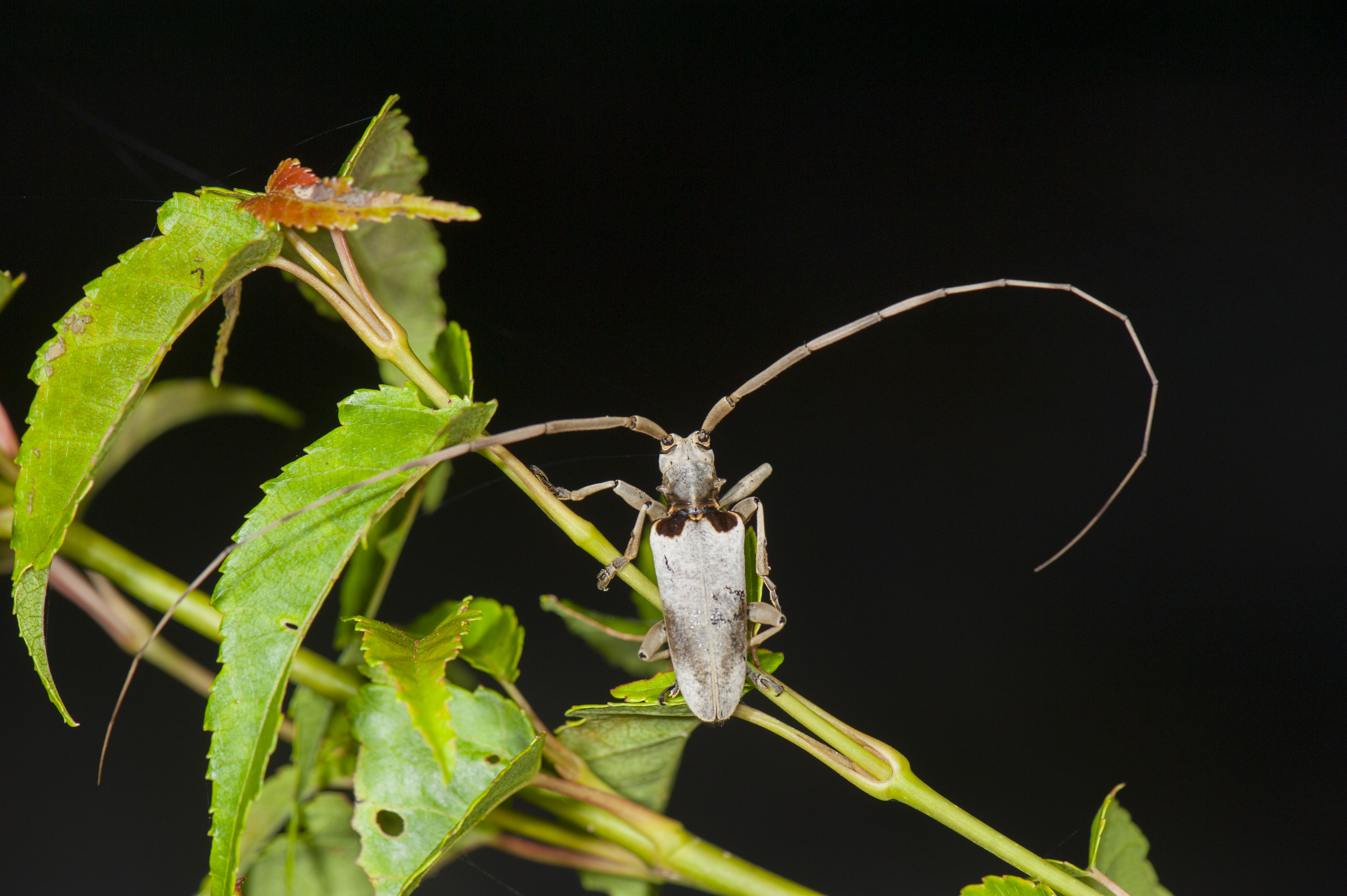
- Acalolepta sublusca maculihumera

Scientific classification
- Domain: Eukaryota
- Kingdom: Animalia
- Phylum: Arthropoda
- Class: Insecta
- Order: Coleoptera
- Suborder: Polyphaga
- Infraorder: Cucujiformia
- Family: Cerambycidae
- Tribe: Lamiini
- Genus: Acalolepta
- Species: A. sublusca

Binomial name
- Acalolepta sublusca (Thomson, 1857)

Synonyms
- Monochamus subluscus Thomson, 1857; Monohammus curialis Pascoe, 1858

= Acalolepta sublusca =

Species of beetle

Acalolepta sublusca is a species of beetle in the family Cerambycidae. It was described by James Thomson in 1857, originally under the genus Monochamus. It is known from Malaysia, China, Singapore, Japan, Laos, Taiwan, Cambodia, and Vietnam.

== Subspecies ==
- Acalolepta sublusca maculihumera (Matsushita, 1933)
- Acalolepta sublusca sublusca (Thomson, 1857)
