= Glenea newmani =

Scientific classification
- Domain: Eukaryota
- Kingdom: Animalia
- Phylum: Arthropoda
- Class: Insecta
- Order: Coleoptera
- Suborder: Polyphaga
- Infraorder: Cucujiformia
- Family: Cerambycidae
- Genus: Glenea
- Species: G. newmani

Binomial name
- Glenea newmani Thomson, 1874

Synonyms
- Glenea commixta Aurivillius, 1924

Species of beetle

Glenea newmani is a species of beetle in the family Cerambycidae. It was described by James Thomson in 1874.
