= Glenea mathematica =

Scientific classification
- Domain: Eukaryota
- Kingdom: Animalia
- Phylum: Arthropoda
- Class: Insecta
- Order: Coleoptera
- Suborder: Polyphaga
- Infraorder: Cucujiformia
- Family: Cerambycidae
- Genus: Glenea
- Species: G. mathematica

Binomial name
- Glenea mathematica (Thomson, 1857)

Species of beetle

Glenea mathematica is a species of beetle in the family Cerambycidae. It was described by James Thomson in 1857. It is known from Malaysia.

== Subspecies ==
- Glenea mathematica alysson Pascoe, 1866
- Glenea mathematica anona Pascoe, 1867
- Glenea mathematica mathematica (Thomson, 1857)
