= Dorcadion micans =

Scientific classification
- Kingdom: Animalia
- Phylum: Arthropoda
- Clade: Pancrustacea
- Class: Insecta
- Order: Coleoptera
- Suborder: Polyphaga
- Infraorder: Cucujiformia
- Family: Cerambycidae
- Genus: Dorcadion
- Species: D. micans

Binomial name
- Dorcadion micans Thomson, 1867

Synonyms
- Dorcadion macropus Kraatz, 1873; Dorcadion subobesum Pic, 1942

Species of beetle

Dorcadion micans is a species of beetle in the family Cerambycidae. It was described by James Thomson in 1867. It is known from Turkey.

== Subspecies ==
- Dorcadion micans micans Thomson, 1867
- Dorcadion micans susheriense Breuning, 1970
