= Glenea taeniata =

Scientific classification
- Kingdom: Animalia
- Phylum: Arthropoda
- Clade: Pancrustacea
- Class: Insecta
- Order: Coleoptera
- Suborder: Polyphaga
- Infraorder: Cucujiformia
- Family: Cerambycidae
- Genus: Glenea
- Species: G. taeniata

Binomial name
- Glenea taeniata J. Thomson, 1860

Synonyms
- Glenea externedivisa Pic, 1943; Glenea latelineata Pic, 1943; Glenea rouyeri Pic, 1943; Glenea stellata J. Thomson, 1860

Species of beetle

Glenea taeniata is a species of beetle in the family Cerambycidae. It was described by James Thomson in 1860. It is known from Malaysia, Borneo and Sumatra.

== Varietas ==
- Glenea taeniata var. sandakana Aurivillius, 1925
- Glenea taeniata var. sulla Aurivillius, 1925
