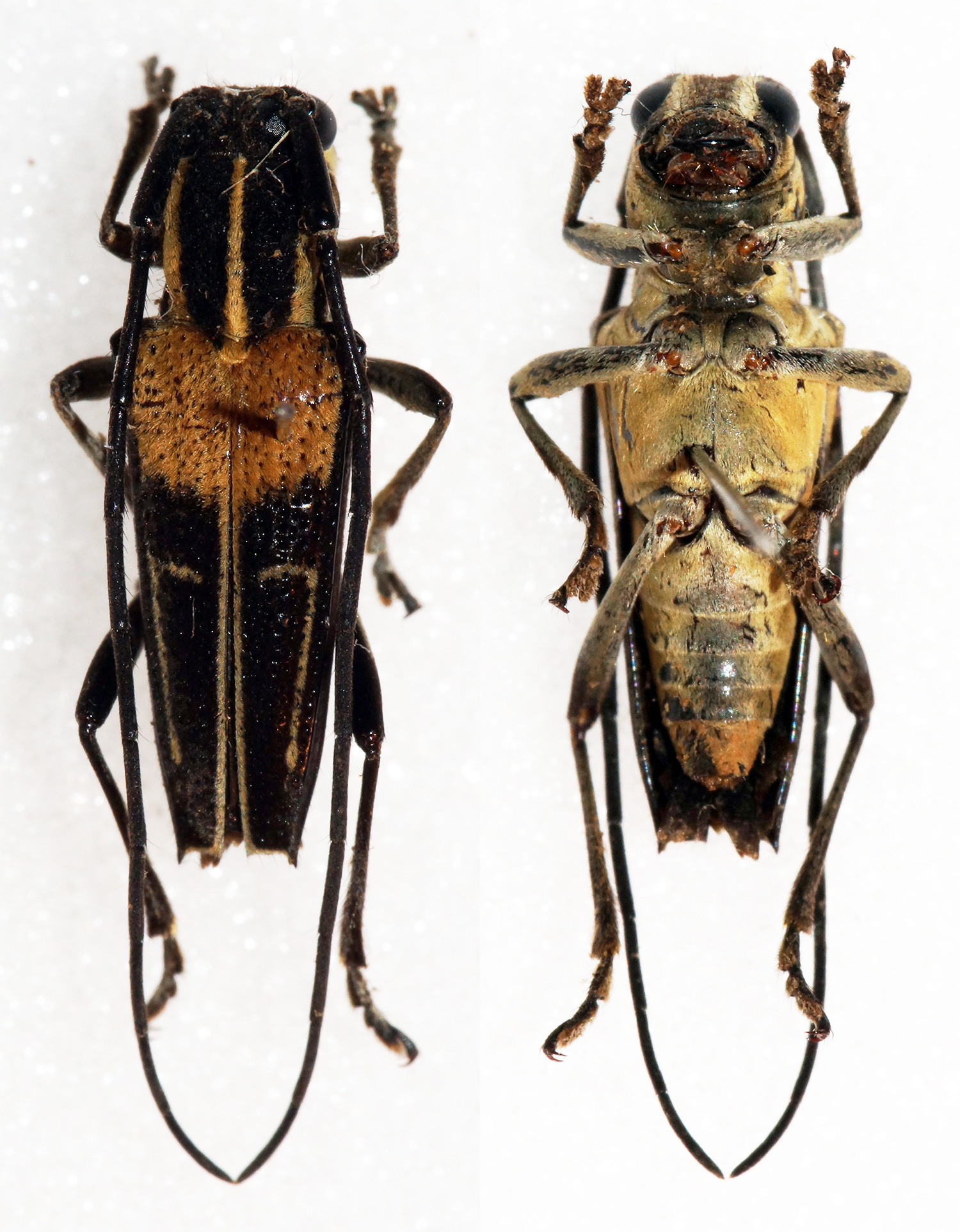

Scientific classification
- Domain: Eukaryota
- Kingdom: Animalia
- Phylum: Arthropoda
- Class: Insecta
- Order: Coleoptera
- Suborder: Polyphaga
- Infraorder: Cucujiformia
- Family: Cerambycidae
- Genus: Glenea
- Species: G. theodosia

Binomial name
- Glenea theodosia J. Thomson, 1879

= Glenea theodosia =

Species of beetle

Glenea theodosia is a species of beetle in the family Cerambycidae. It was described by James Thomson in 1879. It is known from the Philippines and Malaysia.

== Subspecies ==
- Glenea theodosia palavensis Aurivillius, 1903
- Glenea theodosia theodosia Thomson, 1879
