= Glenea algebraica =

Scientific classification
- Kingdom: Animalia
- Phylum: Arthropoda
- Clade: Pancrustacea
- Class: Insecta
- Order: Coleoptera
- Suborder: Polyphaga
- Infraorder: Cucujiformia
- Family: Cerambycidae
- Genus: Glenea
- Species: G. algebraica

Binomial name
- Glenea algebraica (J. Thomson, 1857)

Synonyms
- Stibara algebraica J. Thomson, 1857

Species of beetle

Glenea algebraica is a species of beetle in the family Cerambycidae. It was described by James Thomson in 1857. It is known from Borneo, Malaysia, Java and Sumatra.

== Varietas ==
- Glenea algebraica var. analytica Pascoe, 1867
- Glenea algebraica var. griseofrontalis Breuning, 1956
- Glenea algebraica var. griseosuturalis Pic, 1943
- Glenea algebraica var. mediovittata Pic, 1943
- Glenea algebraica var. tenuefasciata Breuning, 1956
