= Cirrhicera =

Scientific classification
- Domain: Eukaryota
- Kingdom: Animalia
- Phylum: Arthropoda
- Class: Insecta
- Order: Coleoptera
- Suborder: Polyphaga
- Infraorder: Cucujiformia
- Family: Cerambycidae
- Tribe: Hemilophini
- Genus: Cirrhicera; Thomson, 1857

Type species
- Hemilophus leuconotus Castelnau, 1840

species
- 13 species (see text)

Genus of beetles

Cirrhicera is a genus of longhorn beetles of the subfamily Lamiinae. It is distributed from Mexico to Panama.

== Species ==
There are 13 recognized species:

- Cirrhicera bankoi Santos-Silva, Botero & Le Tirant, 2018
- Cirrhicera basalis Gahan, 1892
- Cirrhicera championi Bates, 1881
- Cirrhicera cinereola Bates, 1881
- Cirrhicera conspicua Gahan, 1892
- Cirrhicera cristipennis Bates, 1881
- Cirrhicera leuconota (Castelnau, 1840)
- Cirrhicera longifrons Bates, 1881
- Cirrhicera nigrina Thomson, 1857
- Cirrhicera niveosignata Thomson, 1860
- Cirrhicera sallei Thomson, 1857
- Cirrhicera vandenberghei Heffern & Santos-Silva, 2024
- Cirrhicera veilleuxi Santos-Silva, Galileo & Le Tirant, 2017
