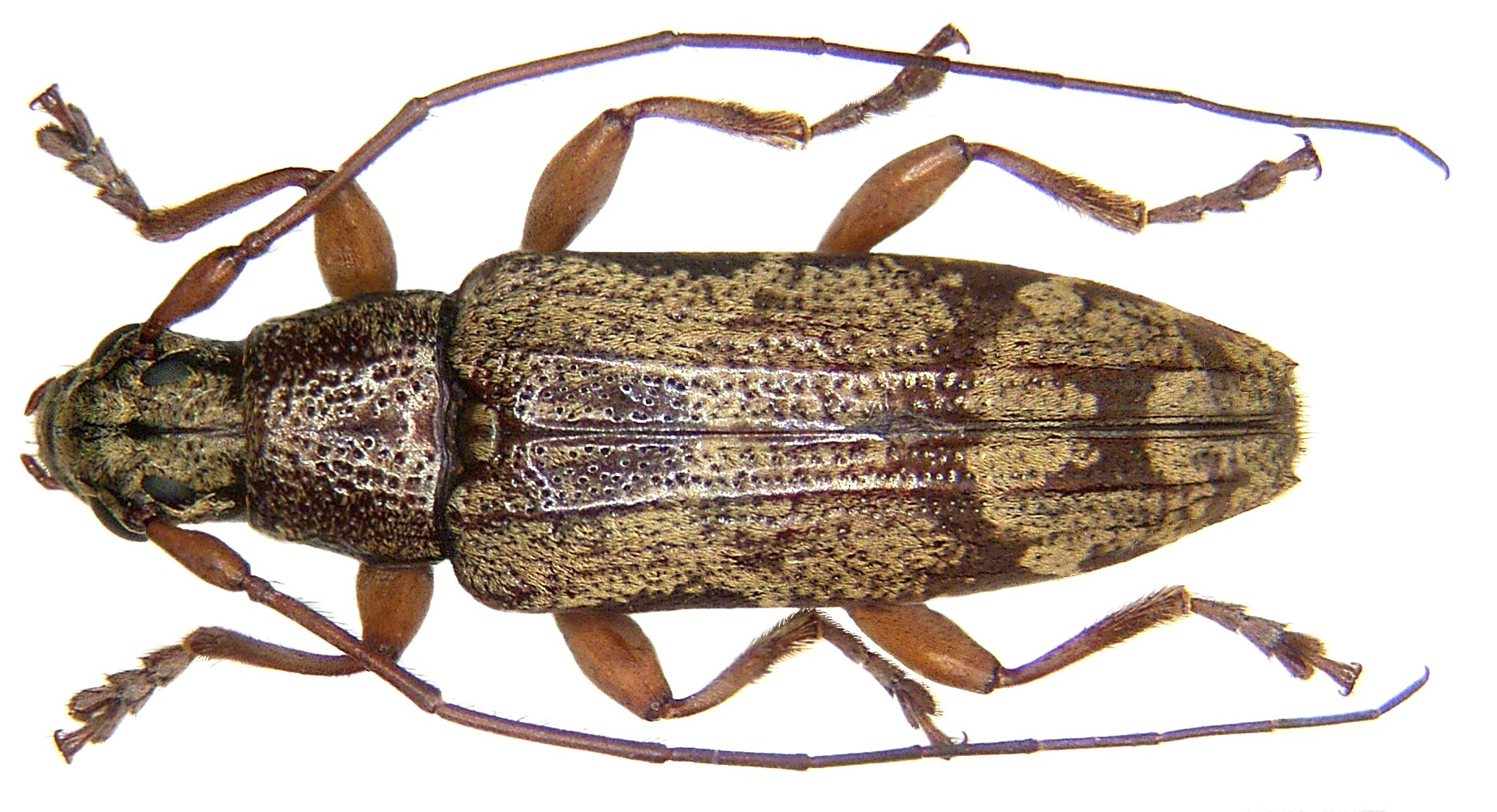

Scientific classification
- Domain: Eukaryota
- Kingdom: Animalia
- Phylum: Arthropoda
- Class: Insecta
- Order: Coleoptera
- Suborder: Polyphaga
- Infraorder: Cucujiformia
- Family: Cerambycidae
- Genus: Tmesisternus
- Species: T. vagus

Binomial name
- Tmesisternus vagus Thomson, 1865

Synonyms
- Tmesisternus tesselatus vagus Breuning, 1945

= Tmesisternus vagus =

Species of beetle

Tmesisternus vagus is a species of beetle in the family Cerambycidae. It was described by James Thomson in 1865.
