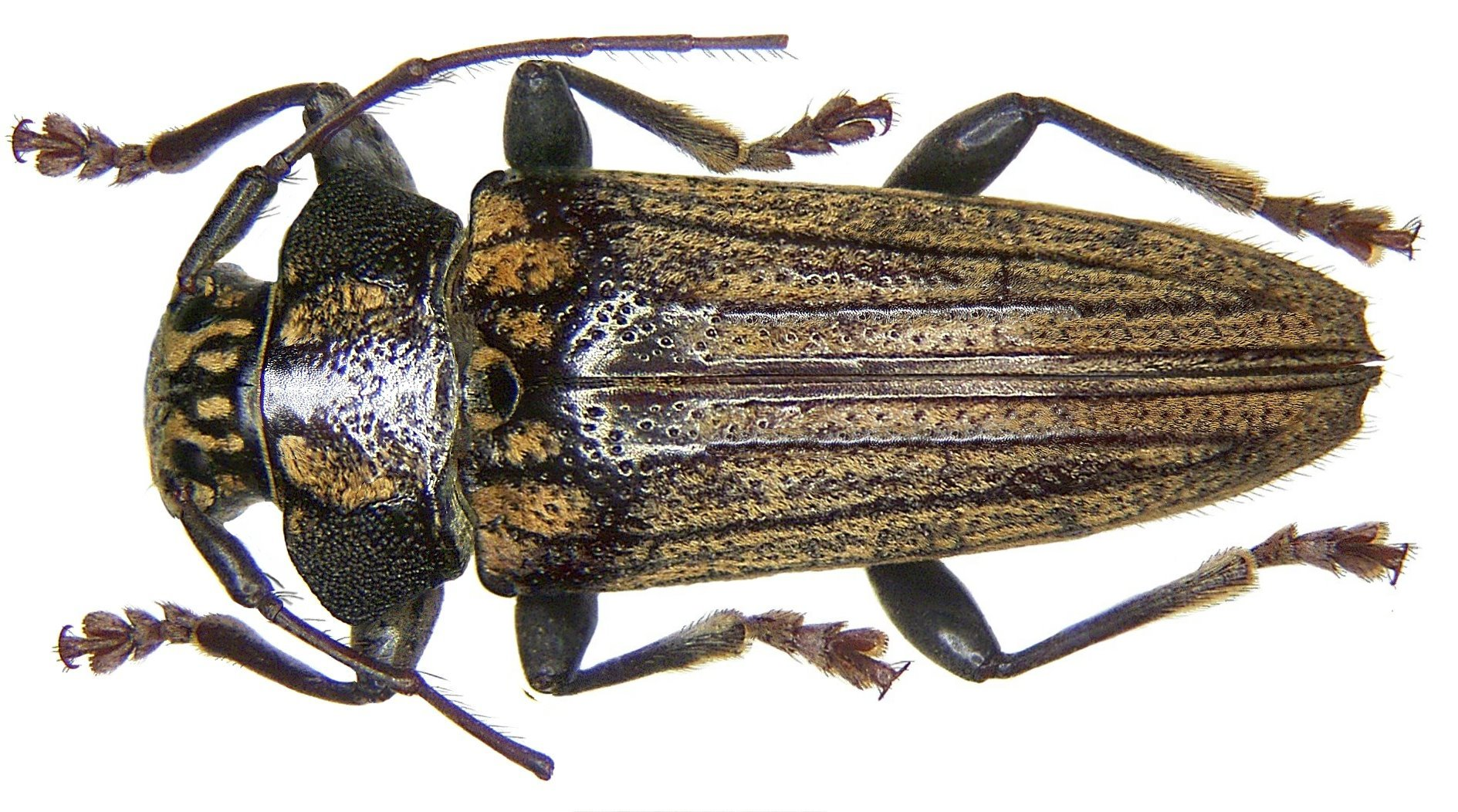

Scientific classification
- Domain: Eukaryota
- Kingdom: Animalia
- Phylum: Arthropoda
- Class: Insecta
- Order: Coleoptera
- Suborder: Polyphaga
- Infraorder: Cucujiformia
- Family: Cerambycidae
- Genus: Tmesisternus
- Species: T. venatus

Binomial name
- Tmesisternus venatus (Thomson, 1864)

Synonyms
- Mneside venata Thomson, 1864

= Tmesisternus venatus =

Species of beetle

Tmesisternus venatus is a species of beetle in the family Cerambycidae. It was described by James Thomson in 1864.

== Subspecies ==
- Tmesisternus venatus venatus (Thomson, 1864)
- Tmesisternus venatus djampeanus Breuning, 1950
- Tmesisternus venatus kangeanus Breuning, 1969
