= Tmesisternus viridescens =

Scientific classification
- Domain: Eukaryota
- Kingdom: Animalia
- Phylum: Arthropoda
- Class: Insecta
- Order: Coleoptera
- Suborder: Polyphaga
- Infraorder: Cucujiformia
- Family: Cerambycidae
- Genus: Tmesisternus
- Species: T. viridescens

Binomial name
- Tmesisternus viridescens (Thomson, 1864)

Synonyms
- Polyxo viridescens Thomson, 1864

Species of beetle

Tmesisternus viridescens is a species of beetle in the family Cerambycidae. It was described by James Thomson in 1864.
