= Glenea scalaris =

Scientific classification
- Domain: Eukaryota
- Kingdom: Animalia
- Phylum: Arthropoda
- Class: Insecta
- Order: Coleoptera
- Suborder: Polyphaga
- Infraorder: Cucujiformia
- Family: Cerambycidae
- Genus: Glenea
- Species: G. scalaris

Binomial name
- Glenea scalaris Thomson, 1865

Synonyms
- Glenea cunila Pascoe, 1866; Glenea (Glenea) scalaris Breuning, 1956

Species of beetle

Glenea scalaris is a species of beetle in the family Cerambycidae, commonly known as longhorn beetles. It was described by the Scottish entomologist James Thomson in 1865.

== Subspecies ==
- Glenea scalaris sandakensis Breuning, 1956
- Glenea scalaris scalaris Thomson, 1865
