= Glenea ochraceovittata =

Scientific classification
- Domain: Eukaryota
- Kingdom: Animalia
- Phylum: Arthropoda
- Class: Insecta
- Order: Coleoptera
- Suborder: Polyphaga
- Infraorder: Cucujiformia
- Family: Cerambycidae
- Genus: Glenea
- Species: G. ochraceovittata

Binomial name
- Glenea ochraceovittata J. Thomson, 1865

Species of beetle

Glenea ochraceovittata is a species of beetle in the family Cerambycidae. It was described by James Thomson in 1865. It is known from Malaysia.

== Subspecies ==
- Glenea ochraceovittata discomedioplagiata Breuning, 1956
- Glenea ochraceovittata elate Pascoe, 1867
- Glenea ochraceovittata ochraceovittata J. Thomson, 1865
