= Dorcadion abakumovi =

Scientific classification
- Kingdom: Animalia
- Phylum: Arthropoda
- Clade: Pancrustacea
- Class: Insecta
- Order: Coleoptera
- Suborder: Polyphaga
- Infraorder: Cucujiformia
- Family: Cerambycidae
- Genus: Dorcadion
- Species: D. abakumovi

Binomial name
- Dorcadion abakumovi Thomson, 1864

Species of beetle

Dorcadion abakumovi is a species of beetle in the family Cerambycidae. It was described by James Thomson in 1864.

== Subspecies ==
- Dorcadion abakumovi abakumovi Thomson, 1864
- Dorcadion abakumovi laterale Jakovlev, 1895
- Dorcadion abakumovi lepsyense Danilevsky, 2004
- Dorcadion abakumovi lukhtanovi Danilevsky, 1996
- Dorcadion abakumovi sarkandicum Danilevsky, 2004
- Dorcadion abakumovi takyr Danilevsky, 1996

== See also ==
Dorcadion
