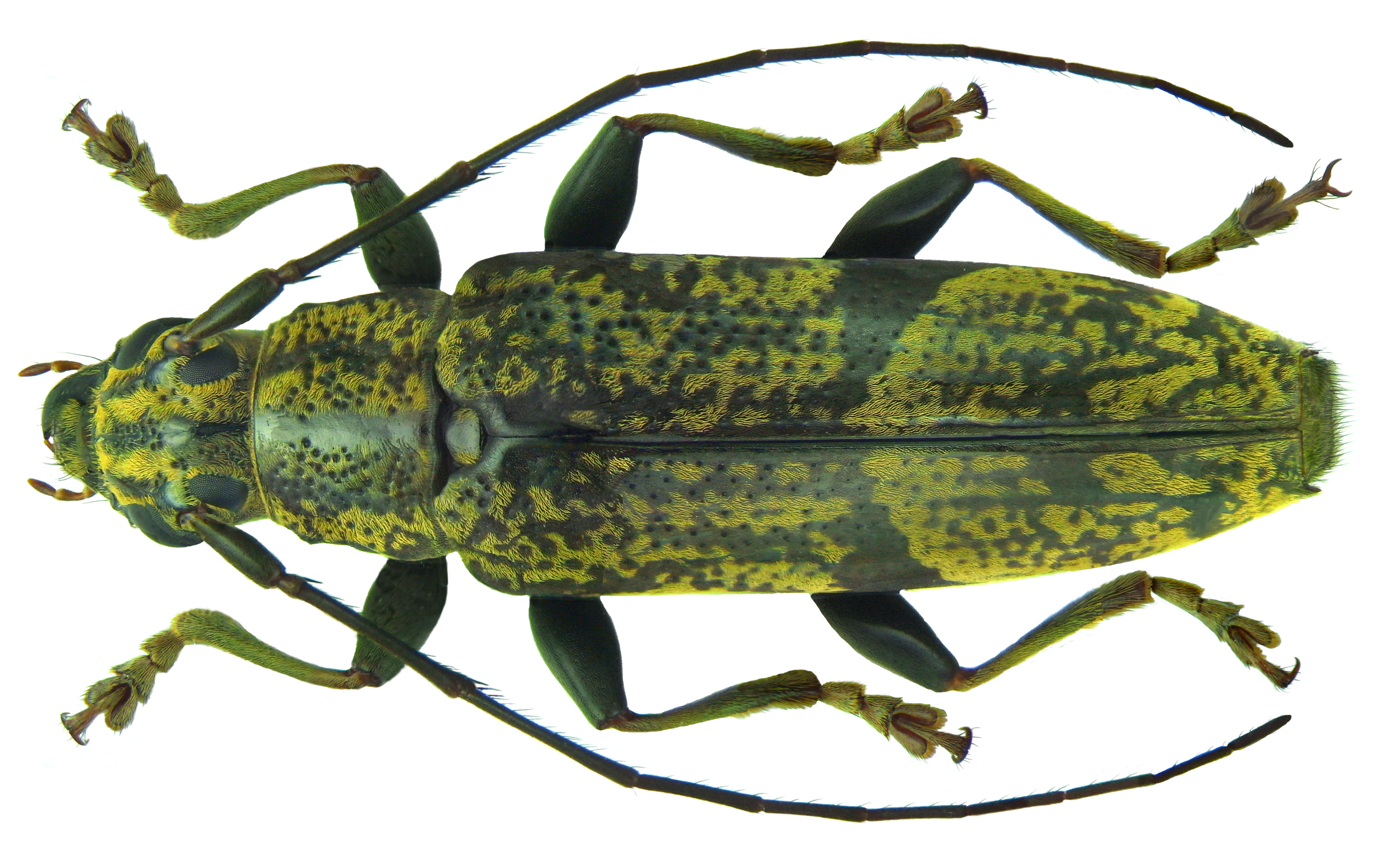
- Tmesisternus griseus (female)

Scientific classification
- Domain: Eukaryota
- Kingdom: Animalia
- Phylum: Arthropoda
- Class: Insecta
- Order: Coleoptera
- Suborder: Polyphaga
- Infraorder: Cucujiformia
- Family: Cerambycidae
- Genus: Tmesisternus
- Species: T. griseus

Binomial name
- Tmesisternus griseus (Thomson, 1865)

= Tmesisternus griseus =

Species of beetle

Tmesisternus griseus is a species of beetle in the family Cerambycidae. It was described by James Thomson in 1865.

== Subspecies ==
- Tmesisternus griseus griseus (Thomson, 1865)
- Tmesisternus griseus agrarius Pascoe, 1867
