= Cirrhicera sallei =

Scientific classification
- Domain: Eukaryota
- Kingdom: Animalia
- Phylum: Arthropoda
- Class: Insecta
- Order: Coleoptera
- Suborder: Polyphaga
- Infraorder: Cucujiformia
- Family: Cerambycidae
- Tribe: Hemilophini
- Genus: Cirrhicera
- Species: C. sallei

Binomial name
- Cirrhicera sallei Thomson, 1857

Synonyms
- Cirrhicera panamensis Bates, 1881; C. sallei var. panamensis Bates, 1881

Species of beetle

Cirrhicera sallei is a species of beetle in the family Cerambycidae. It was described by James Thomson in 1857. It is known from Mexico, Guatemala, Belize, Honduras, El Salvador, Nicaragua, Costa Rica, and Panama.

Cirrhicera sallei measure 6.5–13 mm (0.26–0.51 in).
