= Glenea bellona =

Scientific classification
- Kingdom: Animalia
- Phylum: Arthropoda
- Clade: Pancrustacea
- Class: Insecta
- Order: Coleoptera
- Suborder: Polyphaga
- Infraorder: Cucujiformia
- Family: Cerambycidae
- Genus: Glenea
- Species: G. bellona

Binomial name
- Glenea bellona Thomson, 1879

Species of beetle

Glenea bellona is a species of beetle in the family Cerambycidae. It was described by James Thomson in 1879. It is known from Malaysia, Java, and Sumatra.

== Subspecies ==
- Glenea bellona albomaculata (Gahan, 1889)
- Glenea bellona bellona Thomson, 1879
- Glenea bellona hebe Thomson, 1865
