= Glenea numerifera =

Scientific classification
- Kingdom: Animalia
- Phylum: Arthropoda
- Clade: Pancrustacea
- Class: Insecta
- Order: Coleoptera
- Suborder: Polyphaga
- Infraorder: Cucujiformia
- Family: Cerambycidae
- Genus: Glenea
- Species: G. numerifera

Binomial name
- Glenea numerifera J. Thomson, 1865

Species of beetle

Glenea numerifera is a species of beetle in the family Cerambycidae. It was described by James Thomson in 1865. It is known from Malaysia, Borneo and Sumatra.
