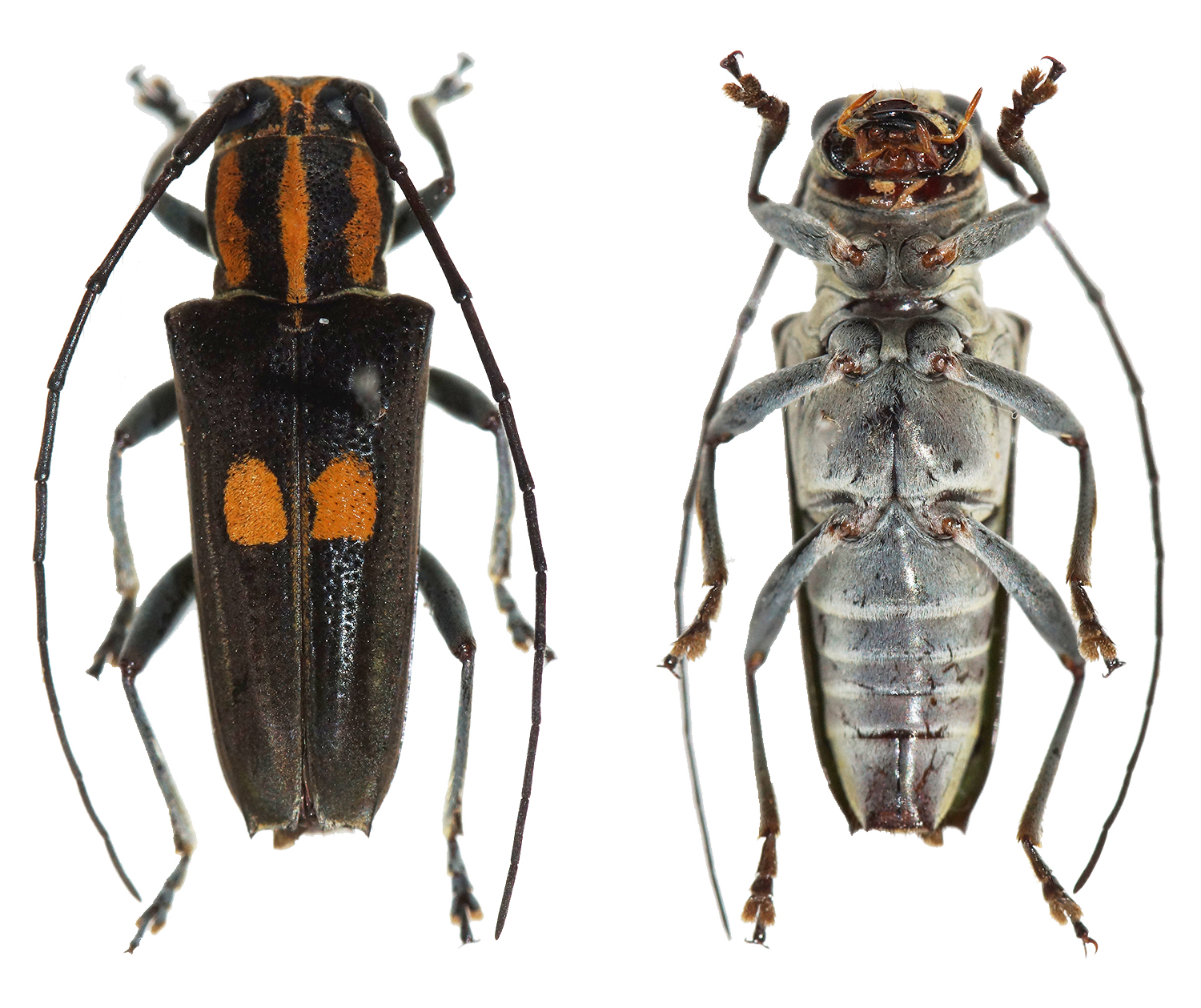

Scientific classification
- Domain: Eukaryota
- Kingdom: Animalia
- Phylum: Arthropoda
- Class: Insecta
- Order: Coleoptera
- Suborder: Polyphaga
- Infraorder: Cucujiformia
- Family: Cerambycidae
- Genus: Glenea
- Species: G. fulvomaculata

Binomial name
- Glenea fulvomaculata Thomson, 1860

Synonyms
- Glenea fulvo-maculata Thomson, 1860

= Glenea fulvomaculata =

Species of beetle

Glenea fulvomaculata is a species of beetle in the family Cerambycidae. It was described by James Thomson in 1860.
