= Glenea angerona =

Scientific classification
- Kingdom: Animalia
- Phylum: Arthropoda
- Clade: Pancrustacea
- Class: Insecta
- Order: Coleoptera
- Suborder: Polyphaga
- Infraorder: Cucujiformia
- Family: Cerambycidae
- Genus: Glenea
- Species: G. angerona

Binomial name
- Glenea angerona J. Thomson, 1865

Synonyms
- Glenea angerona m. intermedipes Breuning, 1971; Glenea intermedia Breuning, 1969

Species of beetle

Glenea angerona is a species of beetle in the family Cerambycidae. It was described by James Thomson in 1865. It is known from Sumatra and Java. It contains the varietas Glenea angerona var. niasensis.
