= Glenea anticepunctata =

Scientific classification
- Kingdom: Animalia
- Phylum: Arthropoda
- Clade: Pancrustacea
- Class: Insecta
- Order: Coleoptera
- Suborder: Polyphaga
- Infraorder: Cucujiformia
- Family: Cerambycidae
- Genus: Glenea
- Species: G. anticepunctata

Binomial name
- Glenea anticepunctata (J. Thomson, 1857)

Synonyms
- Stibara anticepunctata J. Thomson, 1857

Species of beetle

Glenea anticepunctata is a species of beetle in the family Cerambycidae. It was described by James Thomson in 1857. It is known from Borneo, Sumatra, India and Malaysia.

== Varietas ==
- Glenea anticepunctata var. janthoides Breuning, 1956
- Glenea anticepunctata var. mediovitticollis Breuning, 1956
- Glenea anticepunctata var. obsoletepunctata (Thomson, 1857)
