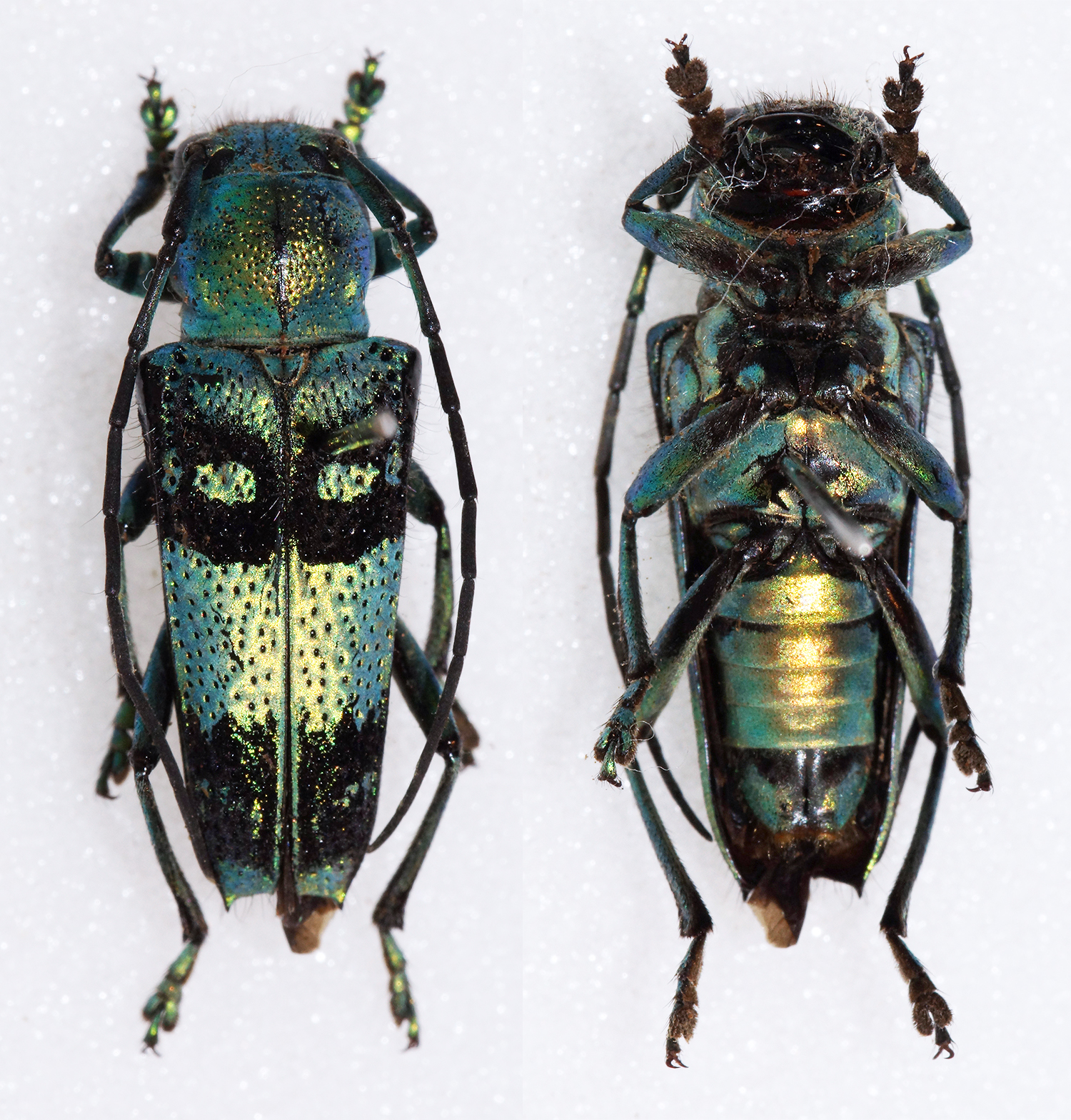

Scientific classification
- Domain: Eukaryota
- Kingdom: Animalia
- Phylum: Arthropoda
- Class: Insecta
- Order: Coleoptera
- Suborder: Polyphaga
- Infraorder: Cucujiformia
- Family: Cerambycidae
- Genus: Glenea
- Species: G. celestis

Binomial name
- Glenea celestis Thomson, 1865

= Glenea celestis =

Species of beetle

Glenea celestis is a species of beetle in the family Cerambycidae. It was described by James Thomson in 1865. It contains the varietas Glenea celestis var. margaretae.
