= Glenea pustulata =

Scientific classification
- Domain: Eukaryota
- Kingdom: Animalia
- Phylum: Arthropoda
- Class: Insecta
- Order: Coleoptera
- Suborder: Polyphaga
- Infraorder: Cucujiformia
- Family: Cerambycidae
- Genus: Glenea
- Species: G. pustulata

Binomial name
- Glenea pustulata J. Thomson, 1865

Synonyms
- Glenea adelia Pascoe, 1867; Glenea cleanthe J. Thomson, 1879

Species of beetle

Glenea pustulata is a species of beetle in the family Cerambycidae. It was described by James Thomson in 1865.
