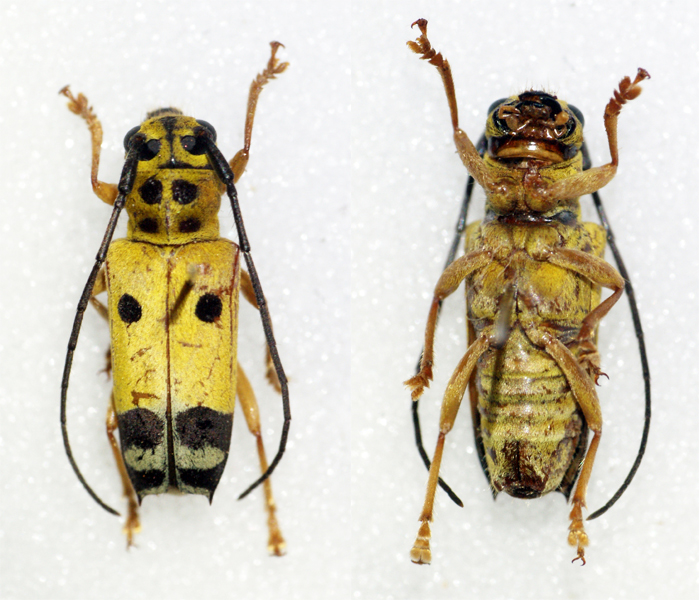

Scientific classification
- Kingdom: Animalia
- Phylum: Arthropoda
- Clade: Pancrustacea
- Class: Insecta
- Order: Coleoptera
- Suborder: Polyphaga
- Infraorder: Cucujiformia
- Family: Cerambycidae
- Genus: Glenea
- Species: G. citrina

Binomial name
- Glenea citrina J. Thomson, 1865

= Glenea citrina =

Species of beetle

Glenea citrina is a species of beetle in the family Cerambycidae. It was described by James Thomson in 1865. It is known from Laos, Java, Borneo, Malaysia, and Sumatra.

== Varietas ==
- Glenea citrina var. anthyllis Pascoe, 1866
- Glenea citrina var. griseoapicalis Breuning, 1958
- Glenea citrina var. plurisignata Breuning, 1958
