= Glenea albolineata =

Scientific classification
- Domain: Eukaryota
- Kingdom: Animalia
- Phylum: Arthropoda
- Class: Insecta
- Order: Coleoptera
- Suborder: Polyphaga
- Infraorder: Cucujiformia
- Family: Cerambycidae
- Genus: Glenea
- Species: G. albolineata

Binomial name
- Glenea albolineata Thomson, 1860

Species of beetle

Glenea albolineata is a species of beetle in the family Cerambycidae. It was described by James Thomson in 1860.

== Subspecies ==
- Glenea albolineata albolineata Thomson, 1860
- Glenea albolineata buruensis Breuning, 1958
- Glenea albolineata lumawigi Breuning, 1980
- Glenea albolineata mindanaonis Aurivillius, 1926
- Glenea albolineata obiensis Breuning, 1950
- Glenea albolineata uniformis Breuning, 1958
