= Cirrhicera nigrina =

Scientific classification
- Domain: Eukaryota
- Kingdom: Animalia
- Phylum: Arthropoda
- Class: Insecta
- Order: Coleoptera
- Suborder: Polyphaga
- Infraorder: Cucujiformia
- Family: Cerambycidae
- Tribe: Hemilophini
- Genus: Cirrhicera
- Species: C. nigrina

Binomial name
- Cirrhicera nigrina Thomson, 1857

Species of beetle

Cirrhicera nigrina is a species of beetle in the family Cerambycidae. It was described by Thomson in 1857. It is known from Mexico.
