= Cirrhicera leuconota =

Scientific classification
- Domain: Eukaryota
- Kingdom: Animalia
- Phylum: Arthropoda
- Class: Insecta
- Order: Coleoptera
- Suborder: Polyphaga
- Infraorder: Cucujiformia
- Family: Cerambycidae
- Tribe: Hemilophini
- Genus: Cirrhicera
- Species: C. leuconota

Binomial name
- Cirrhicera leuconota (Laporte, 1840)

Species of beetle

Cirrhicera leuconota is a species of beetle in the family Cerambycidae. It was described by Laporte in 1840. It is known from Mexico and Honduras.
