= Cenodocus =

Scientific classification
- Domain: Eukaryota
- Kingdom: Animalia
- Phylum: Arthropoda
- Class: Insecta
- Order: Coleoptera
- Suborder: Polyphaga
- Infraorder: Cucujiformia
- Family: Cerambycidae
- Tribe: Pteropliini
- Genus: Cenodocus

Genus of beetles

Cenodocus is a genus of longhorn beetles of the subfamily Lamiinae, containing the following species:

- Cenodocus antennatus J. Thomson, 1864
- Cenodocus borneensis Gilmour & Breuning, 1963
- Cenodocus granulosus Pascoe, 1866
- Cenodocus laosensis Breuning, 1964
