= Symperga =

Scientific classification
- Domain: Eukaryota
- Kingdom: Animalia
- Phylum: Arthropoda
- Class: Insecta
- Order: Coleoptera
- Suborder: Polyphaga
- Infraorder: Cucujiformia
- Family: Cerambycidae
- Tribe: Apomecynini
- Genus: Symperga

Genus of beetles

Symperga is a genus of beetles in the family Cerambycidae, containing the following species:

- Symperga balyi (Thomson, 1860)
- Symperga puncticollis Breuning, 1940
