= Symperga puncticollis =

Scientific classification
- Kingdom: Animalia
- Phylum: Arthropoda
- Class: Insecta
- Order: Coleoptera
- Suborder: Polyphaga
- Infraorder: Cucujiformia
- Family: Cerambycidae
- Genus: Symperga
- Species: S. puncticollis

Binomial name
- Symperga puncticollis Breuning, 1940

Species of beetle

Symperga puncticollis is a species of beetle in the family Cerambycidae. It was described by Breuning in 1940. It is known from Brazil.
