= Cenodocus laosensis =

Scientific classification
- Kingdom: Animalia
- Phylum: Arthropoda
- Class: Insecta
- Order: Coleoptera
- Suborder: Polyphaga
- Infraorder: Cucujiformia
- Family: Cerambycidae
- Genus: Cenodocus
- Species: C. laosensis

Binomial name
- Cenodocus laosensis Breuning, 1964

Species of beetle

Cenodocus laosensis is a species of beetle in the family Cerambycidae. It was described by Stephan von Breuning in 1964. It is known from Laos.
