= Cenodocus granulosus =

Scientific classification
- Kingdom: Animalia
- Phylum: Arthropoda
- Class: Insecta
- Order: Coleoptera
- Suborder: Polyphaga
- Infraorder: Cucujiformia
- Family: Cerambycidae
- Genus: Cenodocus
- Species: C. granulosus

Binomial name
- Cenodocus granulosus Pascoe, 1866

Species of beetle

Cenodocus granulosus is a species of beetle in the family Cerambycidae. It was described by Francis Polkinghorne Pascoe in 1866. It is known from Malaysia and Borneo.
