= Cirrhicera longifrons =

Scientific classification
- Domain: Eukaryota
- Kingdom: Animalia
- Phylum: Arthropoda
- Class: Insecta
- Order: Coleoptera
- Suborder: Polyphaga
- Infraorder: Cucujiformia
- Family: Cerambycidae
- Tribe: Hemilophini
- Genus: Cirrhicera
- Species: C. longifrons

Binomial name
- Cirrhicera longifrons Bates, 1881

Species of beetle

Cirrhicera longifrons is a species of beetle in the family Cerambycidae. It was described by Bates in 1881. It is known from Guatemala.
