= Cenodocus borneensis =

Scientific classification
- Kingdom: Animalia
- Phylum: Arthropoda
- Class: Insecta
- Order: Coleoptera
- Suborder: Polyphaga
- Infraorder: Cucujiformia
- Family: Cerambycidae
- Genus: Cenodocus
- Species: C. borneensis

Binomial name
- Cenodocus borneensis Gilmour & Breuning, 1963

Species of beetle

Cenodocus borneensis is a species of beetle in the family Cerambycidae. It was described by Gilmour and Stephan von Breuning in 1963. It is known from Borneo.
