= Cirrhicera conspicua =

Scientific classification
- Domain: Eukaryota
- Kingdom: Animalia
- Phylum: Arthropoda
- Class: Insecta
- Order: Coleoptera
- Suborder: Polyphaga
- Infraorder: Cucujiformia
- Family: Cerambycidae
- Tribe: Hemilophini
- Genus: Cirrhicera
- Species: C. conspicua

Binomial name
- Cirrhicera conspicua Gahan, 1892

Species of beetle

Cirrhicera conspicua is a species of beetle in the family Cerambycidae, and is a part of the subfamily Lamiinae. It was described by Gahan in 1892. It is commonly found in Mexico.
