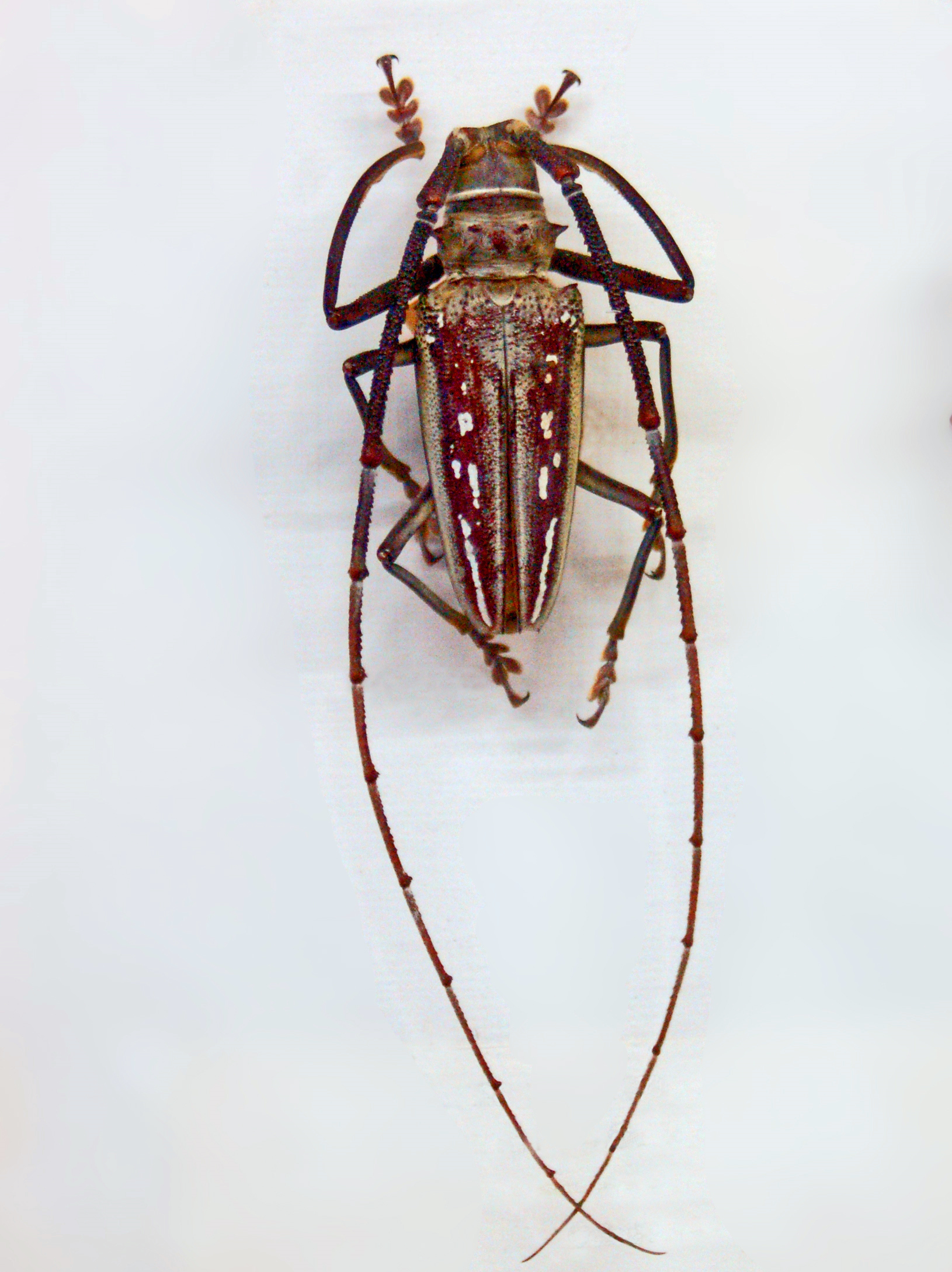
- Batocera wallacei. Mounted specimen at the National Museum (Prague)

Scientific classification
- Kingdom: Animalia
- Phylum: Arthropoda
- Class: Insecta
- Order: Coleoptera
- Suborder: Polyphaga
- Infraorder: Cucujiformia
- Family: Cerambycidae
- Genus: Batocera
- Species: B. wallacei

Binomial name
- Batocera wallacei Thomson, 1858

Synonyms
- Batocera proserpina Thomson, 1865; Batocera phorkyas Kriesche, 1928

= Batocera wallacei =

Species of beetle

Batocera wallacei, common name Wallace's long-horn beetle, is a species of flat-faced longhorn beetle in the subfamily Lamiinae of the family Cerambycidae. The species name honors Alfred Russel Wallace, who discovered this longhorn beetle on the Aru Islands in Indonesia. It was named after him by James Thomson in 1858.

== Description ==
Batocera wallacei is a huge long-horn beetle reaching about 80–85 millimetres (3.1–3.3 in) of length in the males, while the females are smaller. The length of the antenna may reach about 215–230 millimetres (8.5–9.1 in) in the males. The basic colour of the body is greenish-brownish or grey with whitish dorsal patches on the elytra. The larvae are nearly four inches long.

== Distribution ==
This quite common species can be found in Australia (Queensland), Papua New Guinea and the Moluccas (Aru Island, Kei Island) .

== Gallery ==
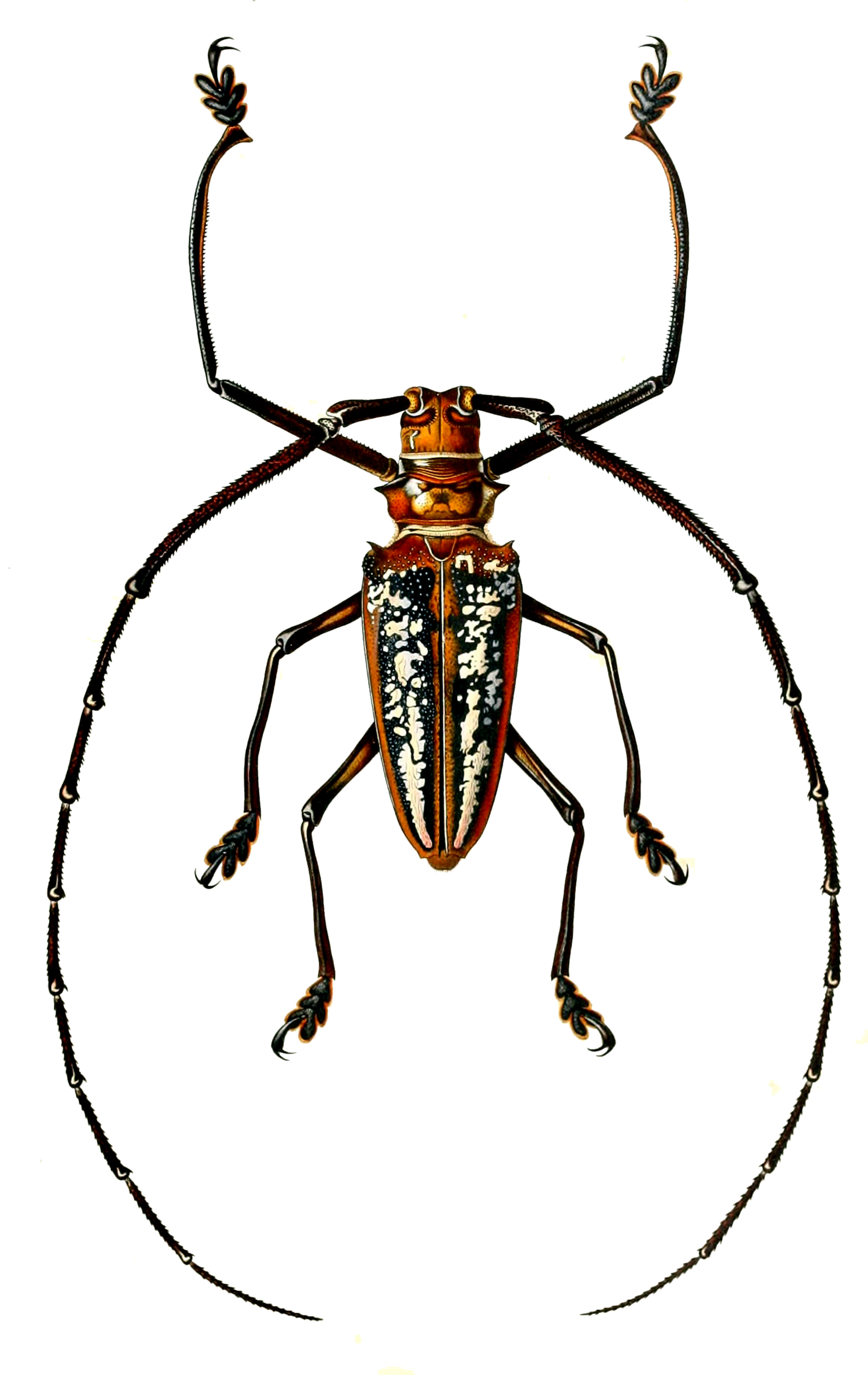
Illustration of Batocera wallacei from Archives entomologiques, ou, Recueil contenant des illustrations d'insectes nouveaux ou rares (1857)

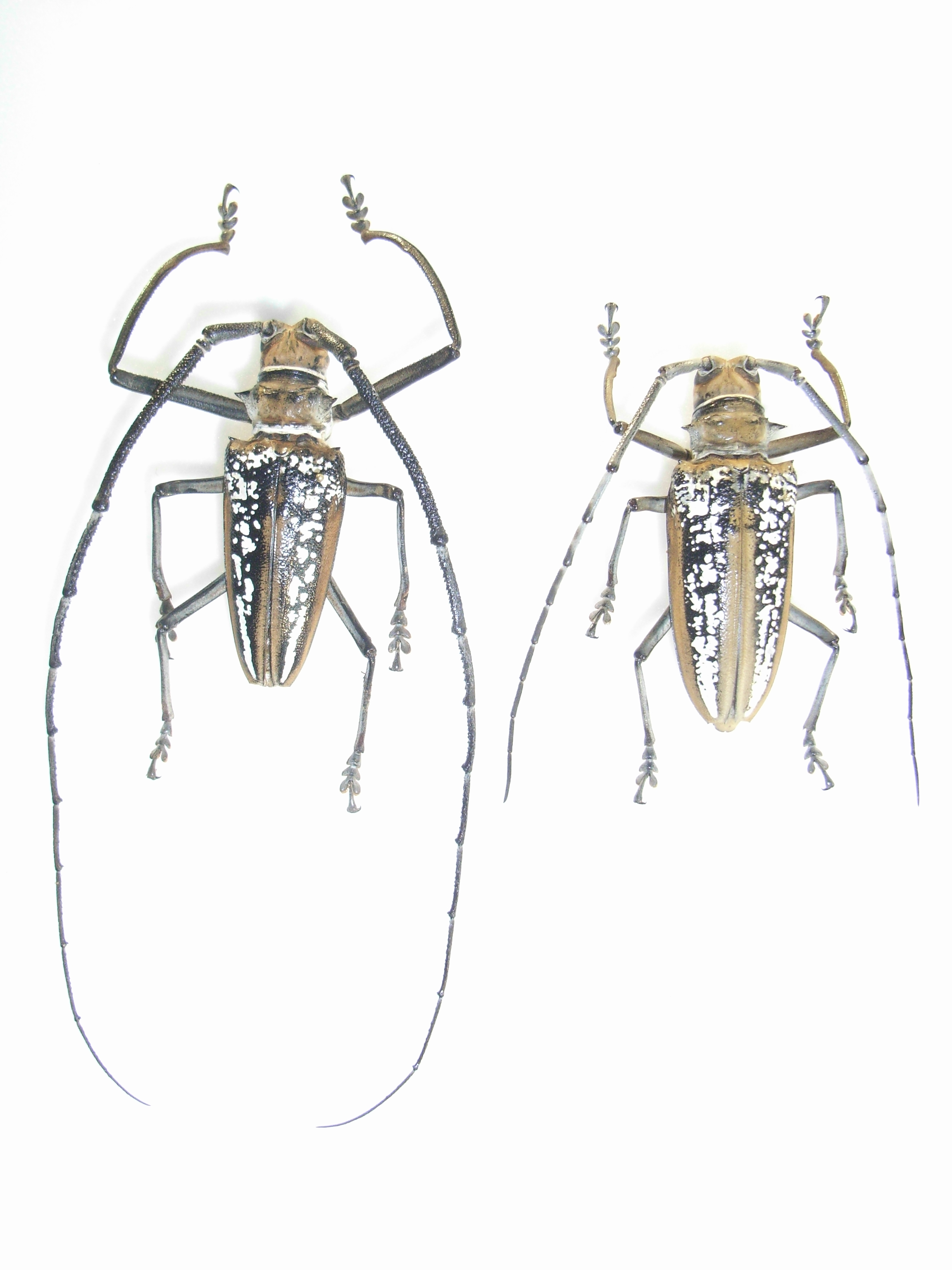
Batocera wallacei. Pair ex coll. Felix Stumpe

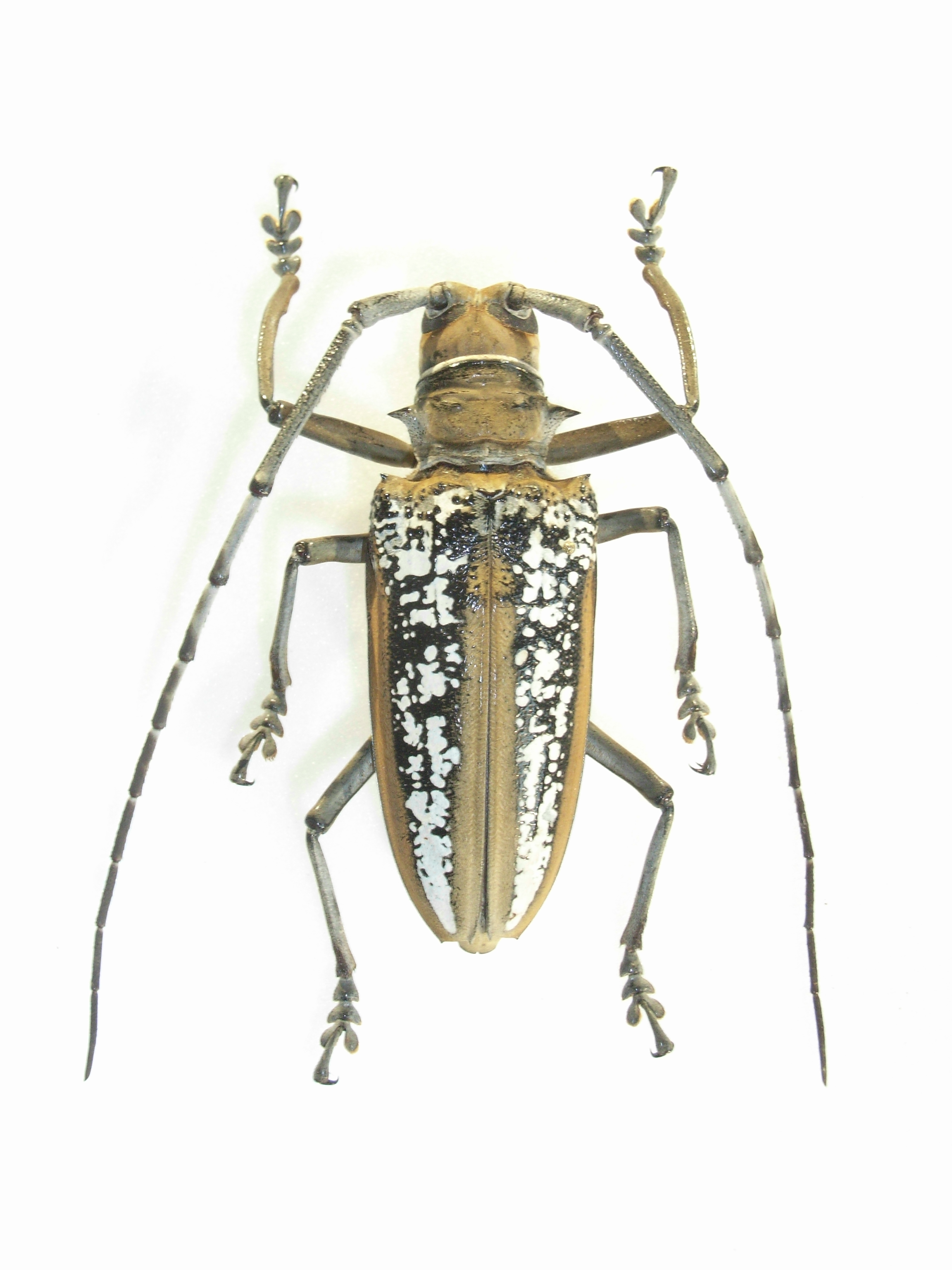
Female of Batocera wallacei ex coll. Felix Stumpe

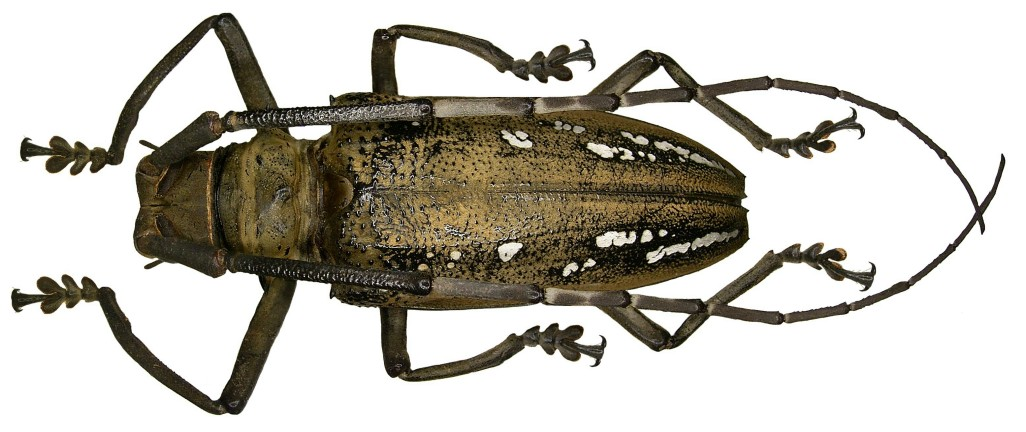
Batocera wallacei from Indonesia, Batanta Isl
