= Hercule Nicolet =

Swiss entomologist and lithographer

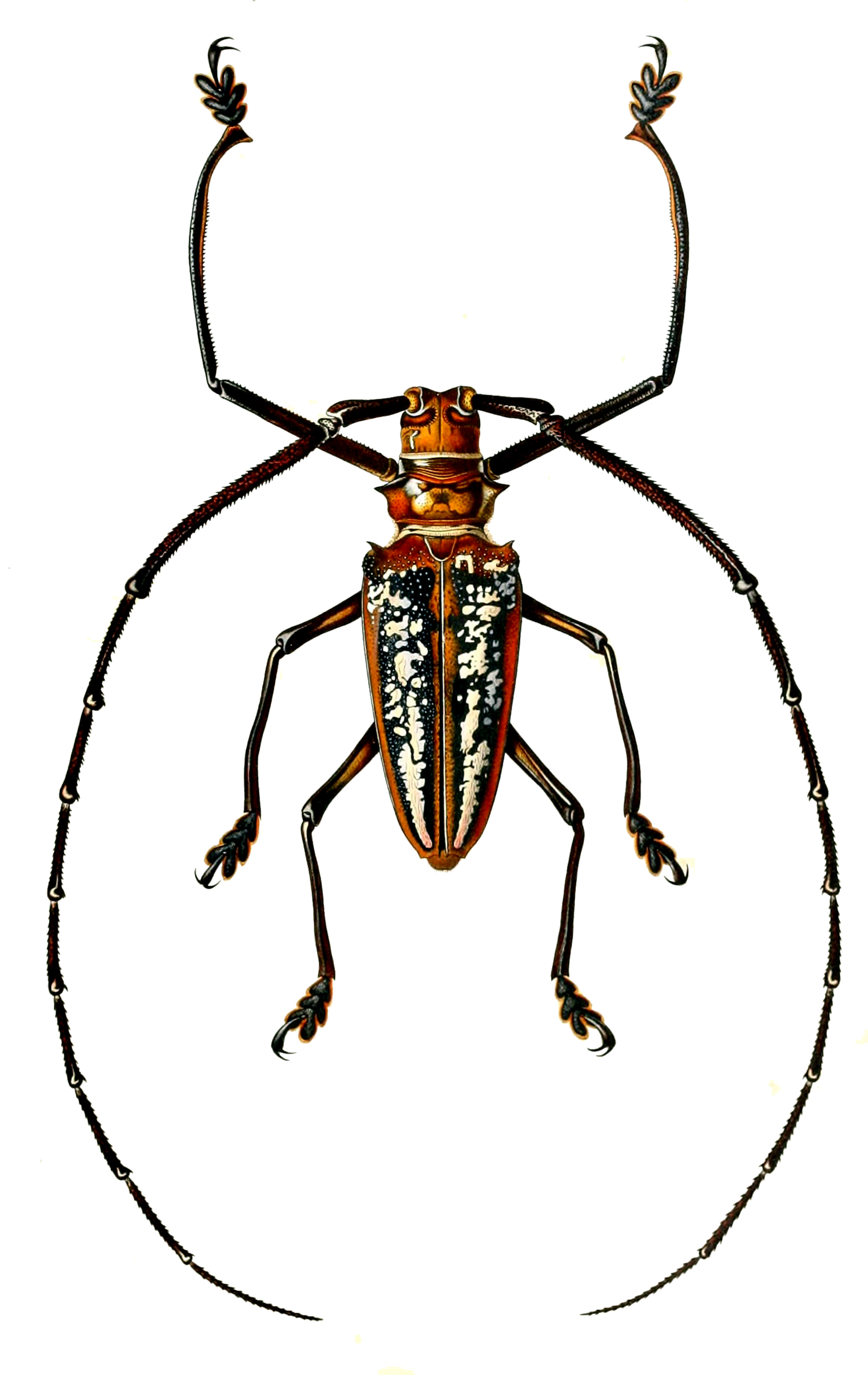
Batocera wallacei

Hercule Nicolet (18 January 1801 in Neuchâtel – 16 September 1872) born Louis-Ami-Hercule Nicolet, was a Swiss lithographer, natural history illustrator, librarian at École nationale vétérinaire d'Alfort from 1861 to 1870, and entomologist who specialized in Thysanura and Collembola.

Hercule Nicolet was the son of Bénédict-Alphonse Nicolet (1743–1807). He was the business partner of Jean Coulin (1822–1883) in the lithographic firm of Hercule "Nicolet and Coulin fils", pressing the plates for Mémoires de la Société des Sciences Naturelles de Neuchâtel co-edited by Louis Agassiz and many other geological and natural history works. He wrote Recherches pour Servir á l'Histoire des Podurelles. Nouv. Mém. Soc. Helvet. Sci. Nat., 6, pp. 1–88 (1842) and "Essai sur une classification des insectes aptères, de l'ordre des Thysanoures" (Séance du 25 Mars 1846) in the Annales de la Société Entomologique de France, 2e Série, Tome V, pp. 335–395 (1847).

He was a Member of the Société entomologique de France.

== Sources ==
- Bonnet, P. 1945: Bibliographia Araneorum. Toulouse 35
- Muñoz Cuevas, A. 2006: Hercule Nicolet Bol. Soc. Ent. Aragon., Zaragoza 36: 455-458
