= James Thomson (entomologist) =

American entomologist

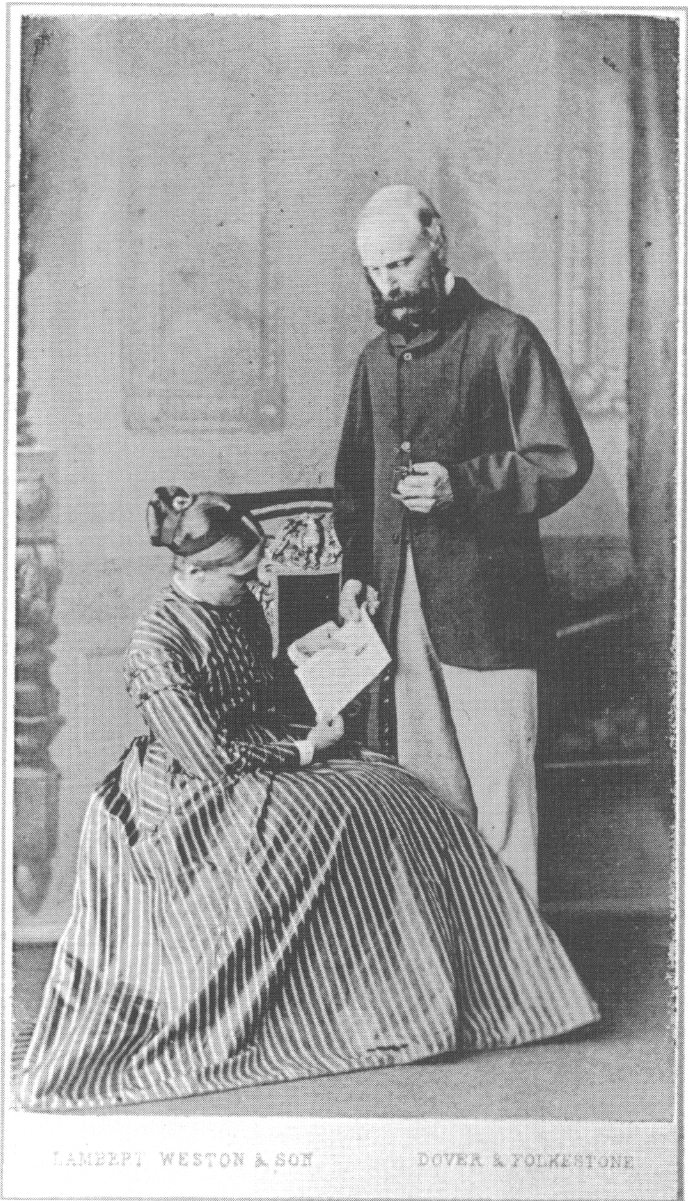
With wife Delia c. 1863. Carte-de-visite from the Société Entomologique de France.

James Livingston Thomson (March 15, 1828 – December 9, 1897) was an American entomologist who studied Coleoptera independently and mostly lived in France. A member of the Société entomologique de France, his collections of Cerambycidae, Buprestidae, Cetoniinae and Lucanidae were eventually sold to René Oberthür.

== Life ==
Thomson was born in New York to James and Mary née Livingston. His mother came from a family of wealth and power in New York. His maternal grandfather had been a secretary to an American diplomat in France and there were many family members with connections to France. It is possible that the family name was originally spelt with a "p" and that it was dropped when members moved to France. Thomson himself was educated in Paris. He married Delia Stewart Parnell, sister of Charles Stewart Parnell, in 1859. They had a son, Henry, who became a musician and died at the age of 21 in 1882. Delia died shortly after and Thomson married Anne D. Parsons from Ohio in 1885 and they moved to France and lived at Villa Elderslie, St Germain-en-Laye and spending winters at the Le Baumette near Nice. His wife's sisters had married into German and English nobility. Thomson died at Les Baumettes. At the time of her death in 1923, the estate of his widow Anne was valued at more than a million dollars. A property included 49 Broadway, New York which was taken back by members of the Livingston Family through a suit.

=== Entomology and other interests ===
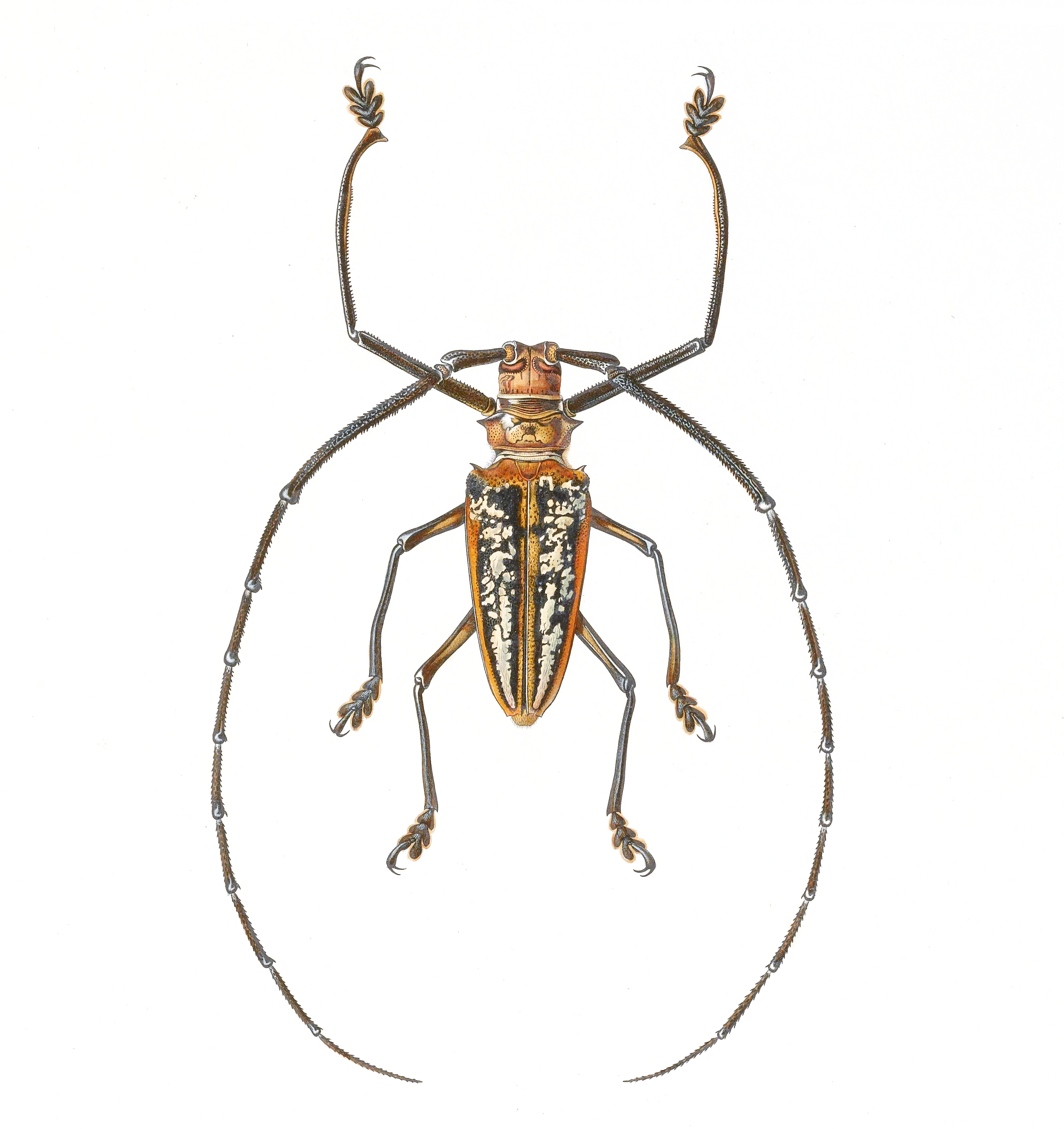
Batocera wallacei by Nicolet from Arcana Naturae

Thomson took an interest in natural history from an early age and had a collection of beetles in 1839 and apparently corresponded with Carlo Passerini in 1840. He purchased specimens and in 1860 his collections numbered 35000 species. He acquired the Cleridae specimens of Faustin de La Ferté-Sénectère and around 1865 he began to concentrate on a selected few beetle families. In 1880 he obtained the Cetoniinae of Higgins which was later sold to René Oberthür. Thomson published extensively between 1856 and 1881, in journals as well as monographs. He made use of the artist Hercule Nicolet to produce his plates. In the preface to the 1858 Voyage au Gabon, he declared his opposition to the abolition of slavery. He also enjoyed bathing spas and had baths installed in his home. Thomson clashed with Guérin-Méneville over the identification of three beetles Quirinus sulcithorax, Leiestes seminigra and Orestia alpina (Endomychidae). The two wrote accusations and rebuttals in the journals in 1857 starting with the claim that Thomson had used generic and species names provided by Guérin-Méneville under his own name. After several heated exchanges, Thomson published a private pamphlet in 1858 against Guérin-Méneville titled De M. Guérin-Méneville et de trois Eumorphides. Limited copies of the pamphlet included colored cartoon by Pasternick with one showing Guérin-Méneville as a Carabid complaining to M. Manticore (Thomson). Another titled "Le Maitre d'Harmonie" had a group of beetle-musicians and their conductor. A third plate had Guérin-Méneville shown as a beetle with the name "Dr Cupido" drawn by a flea carriage. The quarrel subsided with others getting involved including the Marquis de Saint Paul who was a family friend of Thomson. He also clashed with Francis Polkinghorne Pascoe and sought to gain an upper hand as a specialist on the Cerambycidae.

== Selected works ==
- 1857 Monographie des Cicindélides, ou exposé méthodique et critique des tribus, genres et espèces de cette famille par James Thomson Paris :J.-B. Baillière,1857
- 1858 Voyage au Gabon. Histoire naturelle des insectes et des Arachnides recueillis pendant un voyage fait au Gabon en 1856 et en 1857 par M. Henry C. Deyrolle sous les auspices de MM. le comte de Mniszech et James Thomson. in: Archives Entomologiques, Paris 2: frontispiece + 472 p., 14 pls.
- 1859 Physis: Arcana naturae, ou recueil d'histoire naturelle. Paris, chez J.-B. Baillière et Fils, 1859. Frontispiece by Hercule Nicolet
- 1860-1861 Essai d'une classification de la famille des Cérambycides et matériaux pour servir à une monographie de cette famille, Paris
- 1864 Thomson, J. 1864. Systema Cerambycidarum ou exposé de tous les genres compris dans la famille des cérambycides et familles limitrophes. in: Mémoires de la Société royale des sciences de Liège, 19: 1–540.
- 1877 Typi cerambycidarum Musei Thomsoniani, Paris, Deyrolle
