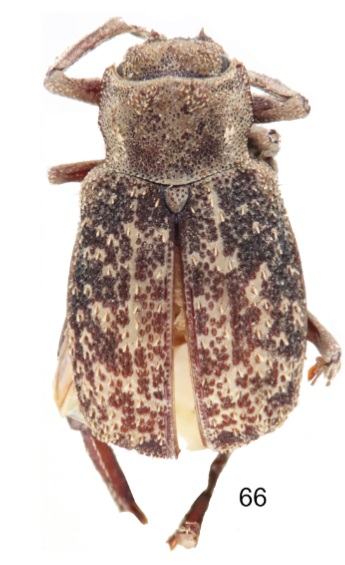

Scientific classification
- Kingdom: Animalia
- Phylum: Arthropoda
- Class: Insecta
- Order: Coleoptera
- Suborder: Polyphaga
- Infraorder: Scarabaeiformia
- Family: Scarabaeidae
- Genus: Maechidius
- Species: M. owenstanleyi

Binomial name
- Maechidius owenstanleyi Telnov, 2020

= Maechidius owenstanleyi =

Species of beetle

Maechidius owenstanleyi is a species of beetle of the family Scarabaeidae. It is found in Papua New Guinea, where it occurs lowland rainforests at about 365 meters altitude.

== Description ==
Adults reach a length of about 6.80–8.30 mm. They have the general features of Maechidius bintang, Maechidius crypticus, Maechidius dendrolagus, Maechidius lapsus, Maechidius merdeka, Maechidius weigeli and Maechidius pauxillus. The dorsum is covered with microscopical velvety pubescence.

== Etymology ==
The species is named after the Owen Stanley Range where it was first collected.
