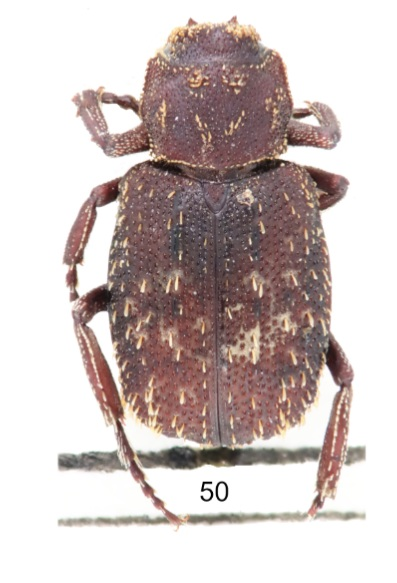

Scientific classification
- Kingdom: Animalia
- Phylum: Arthropoda
- Class: Insecta
- Order: Coleoptera
- Suborder: Polyphaga
- Infraorder: Scarabaeiformia
- Family: Scarabaeidae
- Genus: Maechidius
- Species: M. lapsus

Binomial name
- Maechidius lapsus Telnov, 2020

= Maechidius lapsus =

Species of beetle

Maechidius lapsus is a species of beetle of the family Scarabaeidae. It is found in Indonesia (Irian Jaya), where it occurs in lowland and lower montane rainforests up to 1060 meters altitude.

== Description ==
Adults reach a length of about 5.90–7 mm. They have the same general features as Maechidius bintang, Maechidius crypticus, Maechidius dendrolagus, Maechidius owenstanleyi and Maechidius weigeli. The dorsum is partly covered with dense to moderately dense microscopical velvety pubescence.

== Etymology ==
The species name is derived from Latin lapsus (meaning lapse or slip) since specimens of this species were incorrectly identified and published under the name of Paramaechidius pauxillus by several coleopterists.
