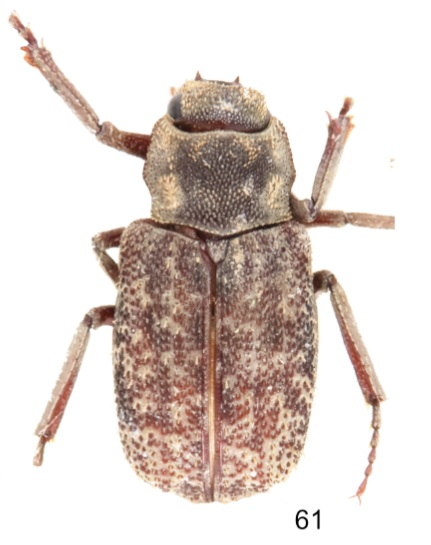

Scientific classification
- Kingdom: Animalia
- Phylum: Arthropoda
- Clade: Pancrustacea
- Class: Insecta
- Order: Coleoptera
- Suborder: Polyphaga
- Infraorder: Scarabaeiformia
- Family: Scarabaeidae
- Genus: Maechidius
- Species: M. merdeka

Binomial name
- Maechidius merdeka Telnov, 2020

= Maechidius merdeka =

Species of beetle

Maechidius merdeka is a species of beetle of the family Scarabaeidae. It is found in Papua New Guinea.

== Description ==
Adults reach a length of about 7.05 millimetres (0.278 in). They have the general features of Maechidius bintang, Maechidius crypticus, Maechidius lapsus and Maechidius owenstanleyi. The dorsal surface is covered with microscopic velvety pubescence.

== Etymology ==
The species name is derived from Indonesian merdeka (meaning independent, free) to celebrate the craving for spiritual freedom of the Papuan people.
