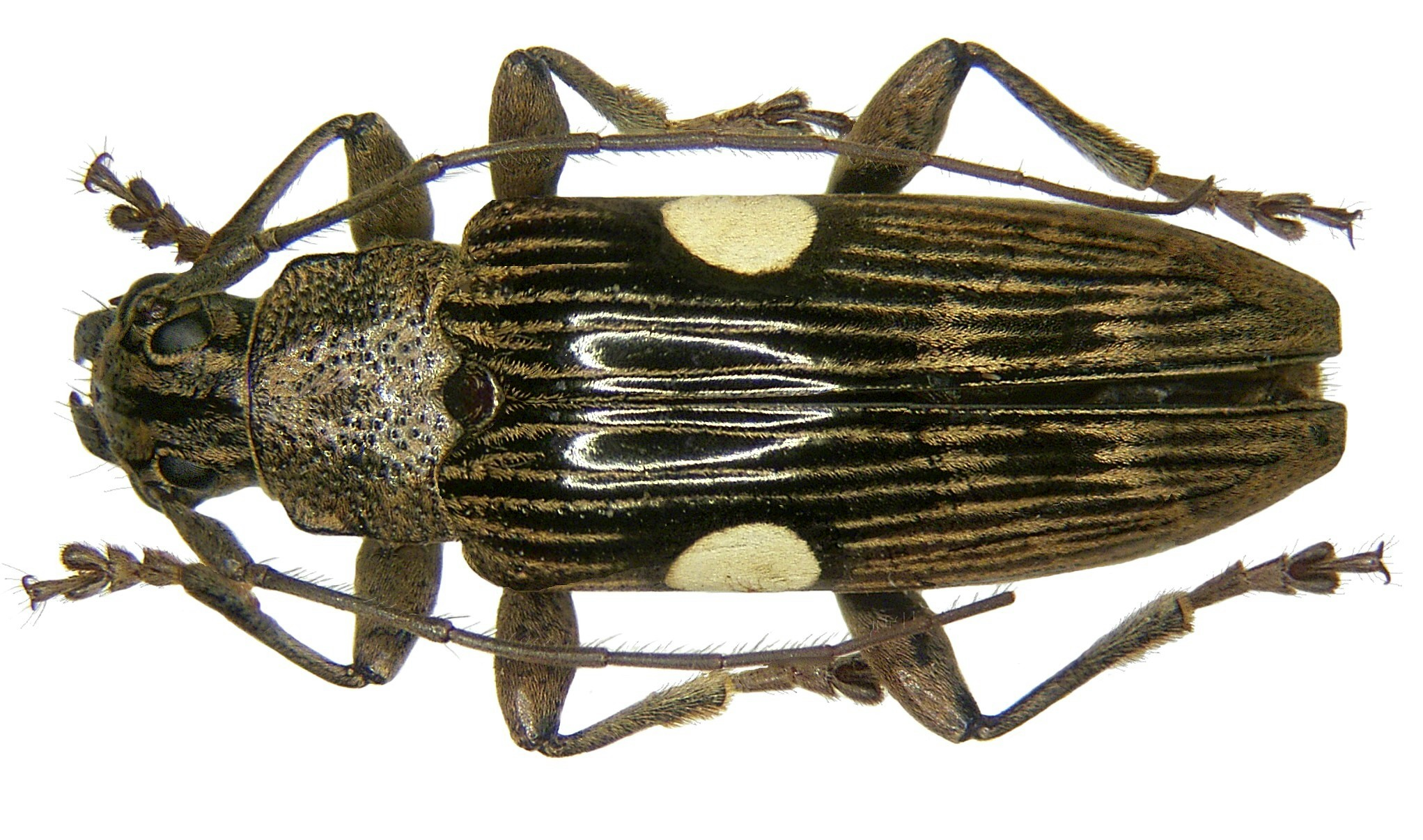

Scientific classification
- Domain: Eukaryota
- Kingdom: Animalia
- Phylum: Arthropoda
- Class: Insecta
- Order: Coleoptera
- Suborder: Polyphaga
- Infraorder: Cucujiformia
- Family: Cerambycidae
- Genus: Tmesisternus
- Species: T. ludificator

Binomial name
- Tmesisternus ludificator (Heller, 1914)

Synonyms
- Tmesisternus bialbatus Gahan, 1915; Arrhenotus ludificator Heller, 1914

= Tmesisternus ludificator =

Species of beetle

Tmesisternus ludificator is a species of beetle in the family Cerambycidae. It was described by Karl Borromaeus Maria Josef Heller in 1914, originally under the genus Arrhenotus.
