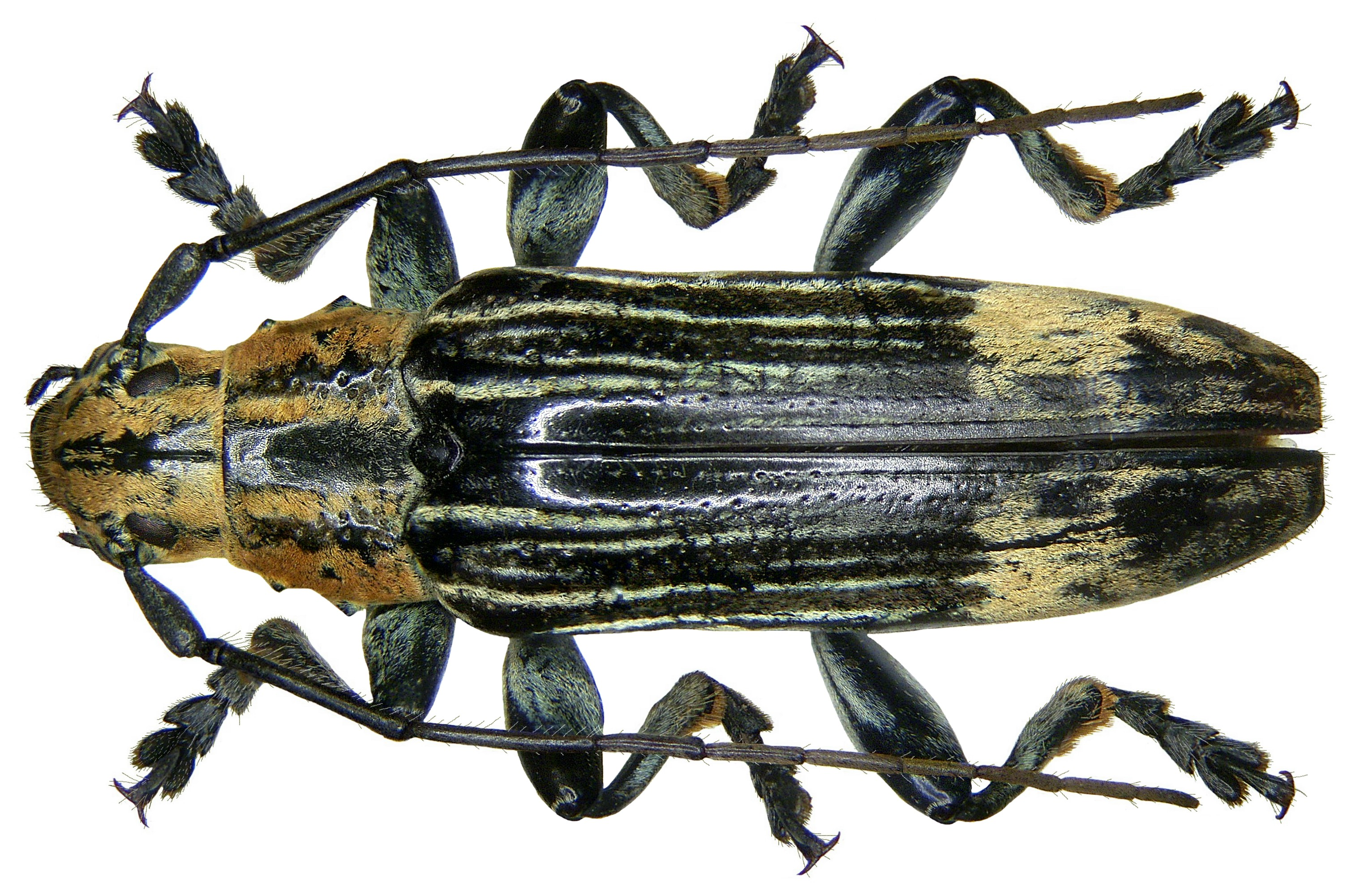

Scientific classification
- Domain: Eukaryota
- Kingdom: Animalia
- Phylum: Arthropoda
- Class: Insecta
- Order: Coleoptera
- Suborder: Polyphaga
- Infraorder: Cucujiformia
- Family: Cerambycidae
- Genus: Tmesisternus
- Species: T. elegans

Binomial name
- Tmesisternus elegans Heller, 1914

Synonyms
- Tmesisternus taeniatus Gahan, 1916

= Tmesisternus elegans =

Species of beetle

Tmesisternus elegans is a species of beetle in the family Cerambycidae. It was described by Karl Borromaeus Maria Josef Heller in 1914.
