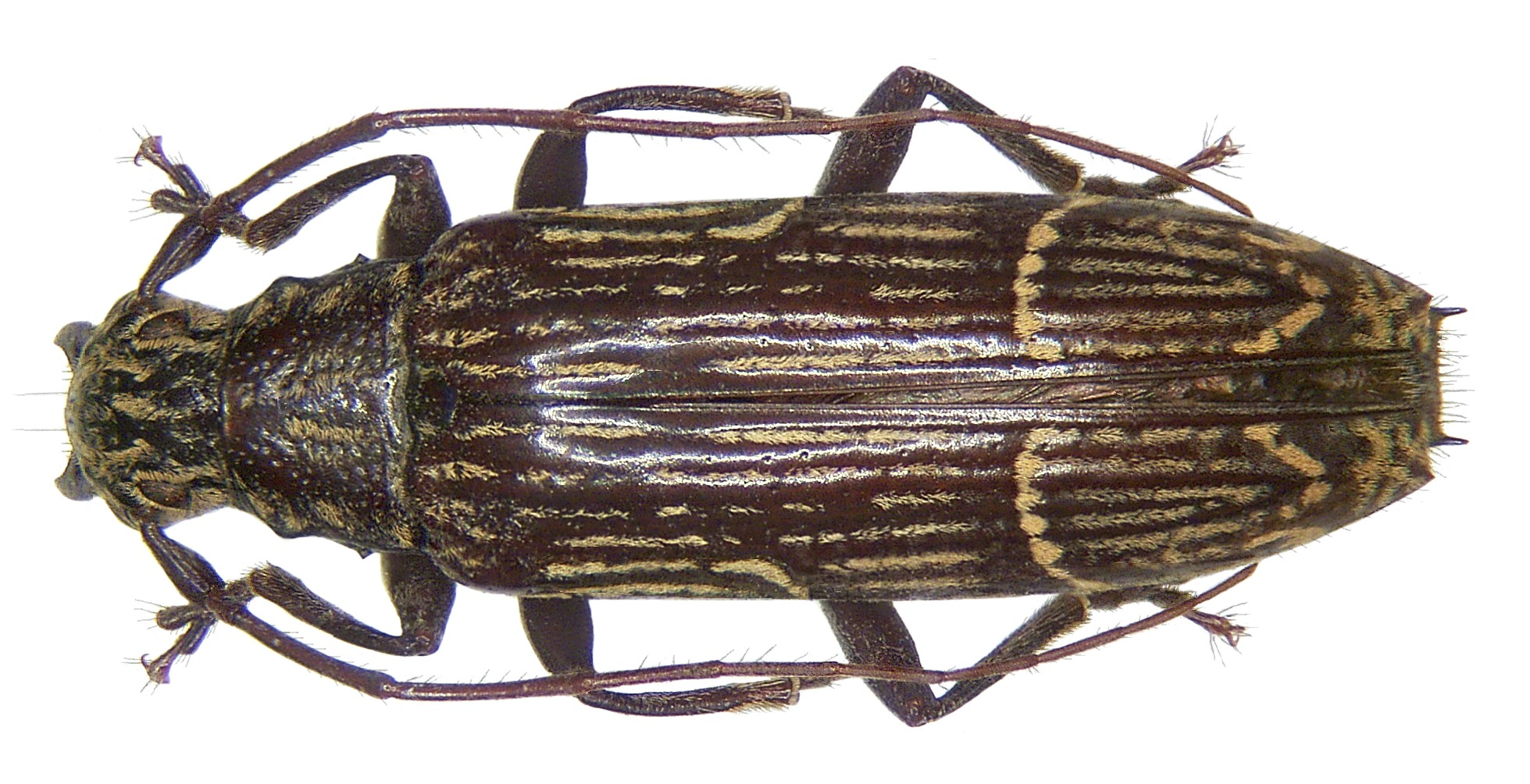

Scientific classification
- Domain: Eukaryota
- Kingdom: Animalia
- Phylum: Arthropoda
- Class: Insecta
- Order: Coleoptera
- Suborder: Polyphaga
- Infraorder: Cucujiformia
- Family: Cerambycidae
- Genus: Tmesisternus
- Species: T. luteostriatus

Binomial name
- Tmesisternus luteostriatus Heller, 1912

Synonyms
- Tmesisternus elongatipennis Breuning, 1966

= Tmesisternus luteostriatus =

Species of beetle

Tmesisternus luteostriatus is a species of beetle in the family Cerambycidae. It was described by Karl Borromaeus Maria Josef Heller in 1912.
