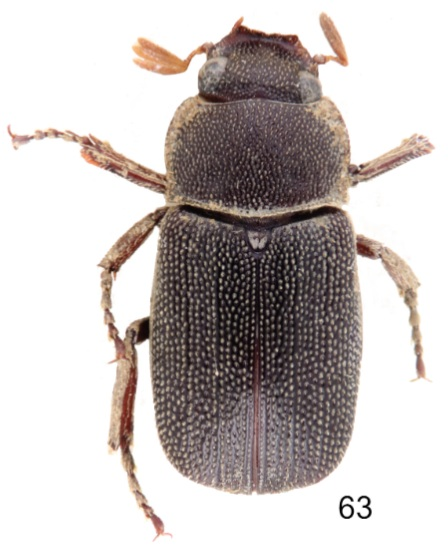

Scientific classification
- Kingdom: Animalia
- Phylum: Arthropoda
- Class: Insecta
- Order: Coleoptera
- Suborder: Polyphaga
- Infraorder: Scarabaeiformia
- Family: Scarabaeidae
- Genus: Maechidius
- Species: M. muticus

Binomial name
- Maechidius muticus Arrow, 1941

= Maechidius muticus =

Species of beetle

Maechidius muticus is a species of beetle of the family Scarabaeidae. It is found in Indonesia (Irian Jaya).

== Description ==
They have the general features of Maechidius interruptocarinulatus.
