= Tmesisternus vinculatus =

Scientific classification
- Domain: Eukaryota
- Kingdom: Animalia
- Phylum: Arthropoda
- Class: Insecta
- Order: Coleoptera
- Suborder: Polyphaga
- Infraorder: Cucujiformia
- Family: Cerambycidae
- Genus: Tmesisternus
- Species: T. vinculatus

Binomial name
- Tmesisternus vinculatus Heller, 1914

Synonyms
- Tmesisternus pseudovinculatus Breuning, 1970

Species of beetle

Tmesisternus vinculatus is a species of beetle in the family Cerambycidae. It was described by Karl Borromaeus Maria Josef Heller in 1914.
