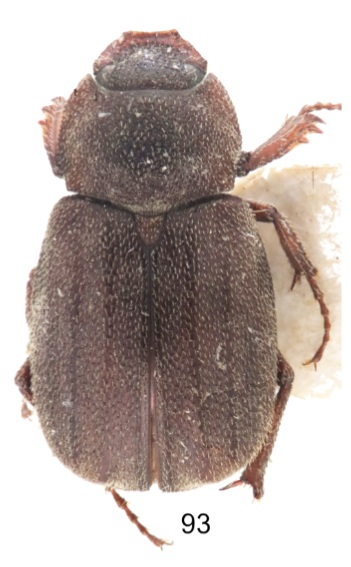

Scientific classification
- Kingdom: Animalia
- Phylum: Arthropoda
- Class: Insecta
- Order: Coleoptera
- Suborder: Polyphaga
- Infraorder: Scarabaeiformia
- Family: Scarabaeidae
- Genus: Maechidius
- Species: M. vicinus

Binomial name
- Maechidius vicinus Heller, 1914

= Maechidius vicinus =

Species of beetle

Maechidius vicinus is a species of beetle of the family Scarabaeidae. It is found in Papua New Guinea.

== Description ==
Adults reach a length of about 6.20–6.90 mm. The dorsum is uniformly brown, the forebody dorsally with a very vague green lustre. The venter and appendages are paler brown.
