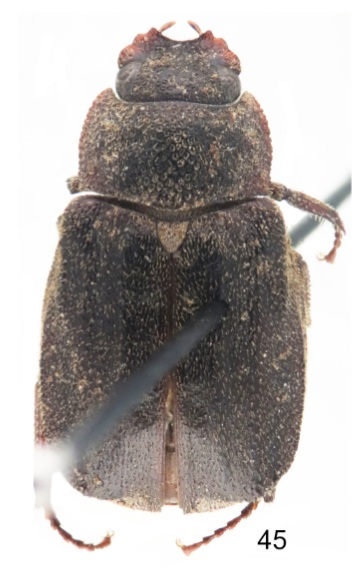

Scientific classification
- Kingdom: Animalia
- Phylum: Arthropoda
- Class: Insecta
- Order: Coleoptera
- Suborder: Polyphaga
- Infraorder: Scarabaeiformia
- Family: Scarabaeidae
- Genus: Maechidius
- Species: M. humeralis

Binomial name
- Maechidius humeralis Heller, 1914

= Maechidius humeralis =

Species of beetle

Maechidius humeralis is a species of beetle of the family Scarabaeidae. It is found in Papua New Guinea.

== Description ==
Adults reach a length of about 6.80 mm. The dorsum and venter are uniformly black-brown, except for the brown appendages and labroclypeus.
