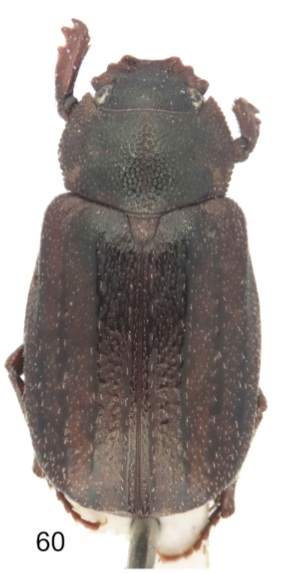

Scientific classification
- Kingdom: Animalia
- Phylum: Arthropoda
- Class: Insecta
- Order: Coleoptera
- Suborder: Polyphaga
- Infraorder: Scarabaeiformia
- Family: Scarabaeidae
- Genus: Maechidius
- Species: M. milneanus

Binomial name
- Maechidius milneanus Heller, 1914

= Maechidius milneanus =

Species of beetle

Maechidius milneanus is a species of beetle of the family Scarabaeidae. It is found in Papua New Guinea.

== Description ==
Adults reach a length of about 7.30–9.10 mm. The dorsum and venter are uniformly brown, while the appendages are somewhat paler, the forebody with a greenish metallic lustre.
