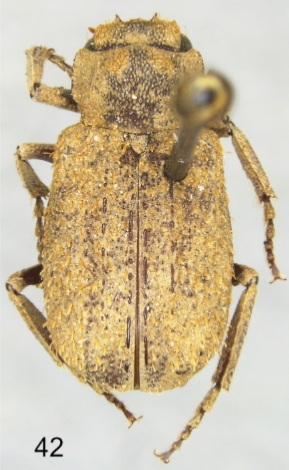

Scientific classification
- Kingdom: Animalia
- Phylum: Arthropoda
- Class: Insecta
- Order: Coleoptera
- Suborder: Polyphaga
- Infraorder: Scarabaeiformia
- Family: Scarabaeidae
- Genus: Maechidius
- Species: M. heterosquamosus

Binomial name
- Maechidius heterosquamosus Heller, 1910

Synonyms
- Paramaechidius clypeatus Frey, 1969

= Maechidius heterosquamosus =

Species of beetle

Maechidius heterosquamosus is a species of beetle of the family Scarabaeidae. It is found in Papua New Guinea.

== Description ==
Adults reach a length of about 7–8.10 mm. The dorsum and venter are uniformly brown. The head is strongly convex dorsally between the eyes, and glossy dorsally and ventrally.
