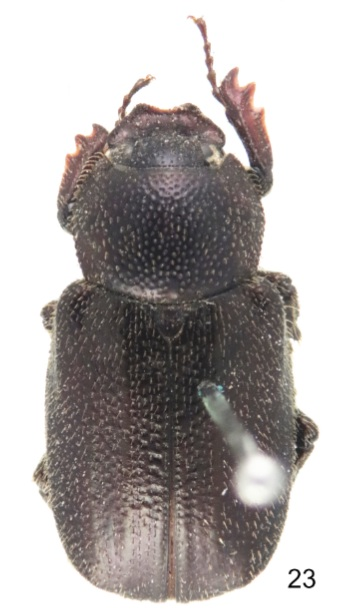

Scientific classification
- Kingdom: Animalia
- Phylum: Arthropoda
- Class: Insecta
- Order: Coleoptera
- Suborder: Polyphaga
- Infraorder: Scarabaeiformia
- Family: Scarabaeidae
- Genus: Maechidius
- Species: M. aroae

Binomial name
- Maechidius aroae Heller, 1914

= Maechidius aroae =

Species of beetle

Maechidius aroae is a species of beetle of the family Scarabaeidae. It is found in Papua New Guinea.

== Description ==
Adults reach a length of about 9.6 mm. The dorsum and venter are uniformly black-brown with exception of the paler brown appendages and labroclypeus.
