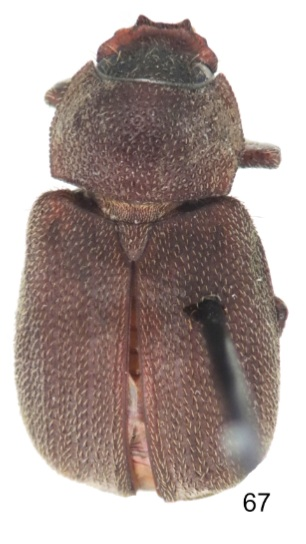

Scientific classification
- Kingdom: Animalia
- Phylum: Arthropoda
- Class: Insecta
- Order: Coleoptera
- Suborder: Polyphaga
- Infraorder: Scarabaeiformia
- Family: Scarabaeidae
- Genus: Maechidius
- Species: M. paupianus

Binomial name
- Maechidius paupianus Heller, 1910

Synonyms
- Maechidius arrowi Frey, 1969

= Maechidius paupianus =

Species of beetle

Maechidius paupianus is a species of beetle of the family Scarabaeidae. It is found in Papua New Guinea and Indonesia (Irian Jaya).

== Description ==
Adults reach a length of about 5.90–7.50 mm. The dorsum is uniformly brown, while the venter and appendages are somewhat paler.
