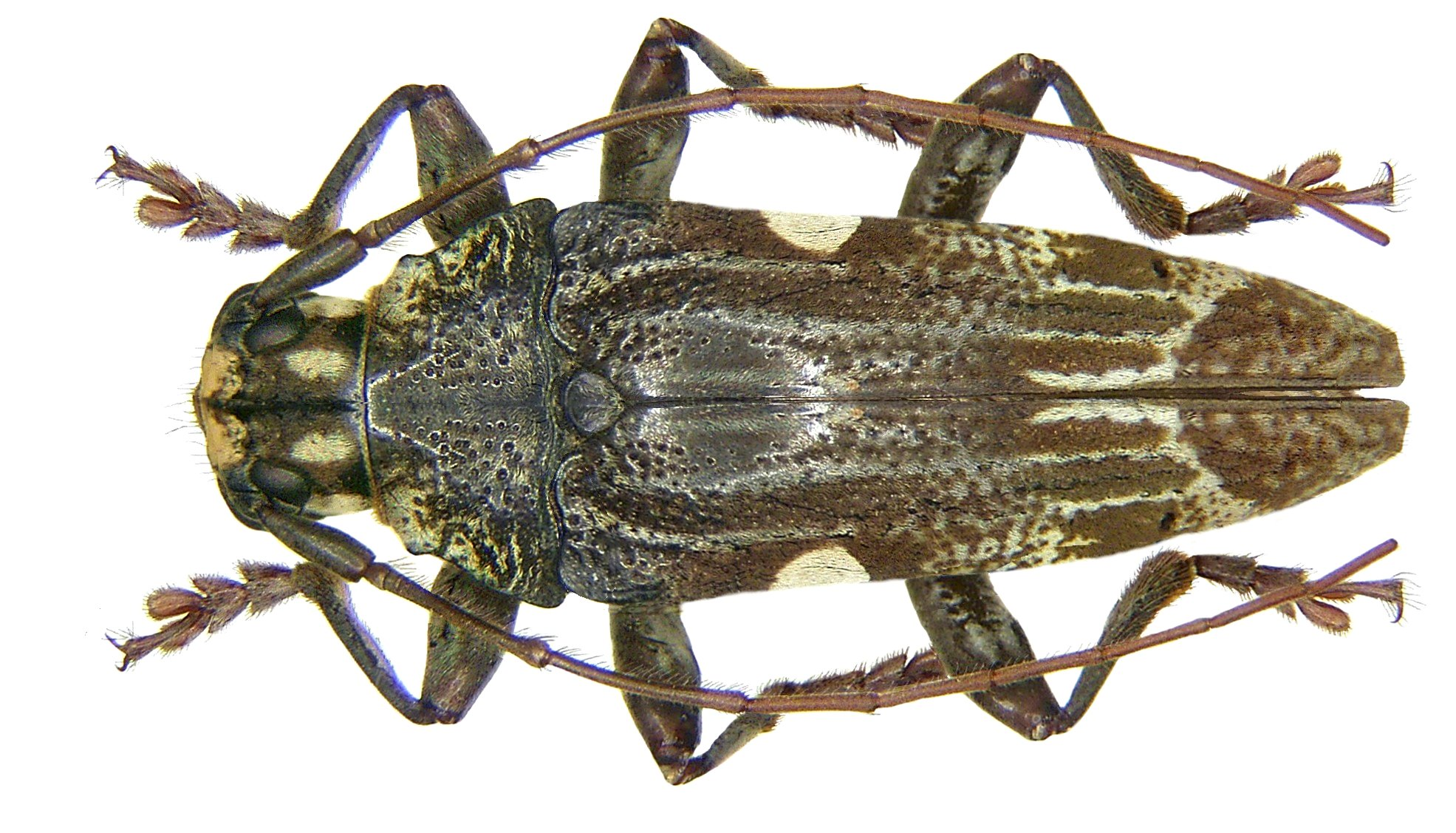

Scientific classification
- Domain: Eukaryota
- Kingdom: Animalia
- Phylum: Arthropoda
- Class: Insecta
- Order: Coleoptera
- Suborder: Polyphaga
- Infraorder: Cucujiformia
- Family: Cerambycidae
- Genus: Tmesisternus
- Species: T. trapezicollis

Binomial name
- Tmesisternus trapezicollis Heller, 1914

Synonyms
- Tmesisternus laticollis Gahan, 1915

= Tmesisternus trapezicollis =

Species of beetle

Tmesisternus trapezicollis is a species of beetle in the family Cerambycidae. It was described by Karl Borromaeus Maria Josef Heller in 1914. It is known from Papua New Guinea.
