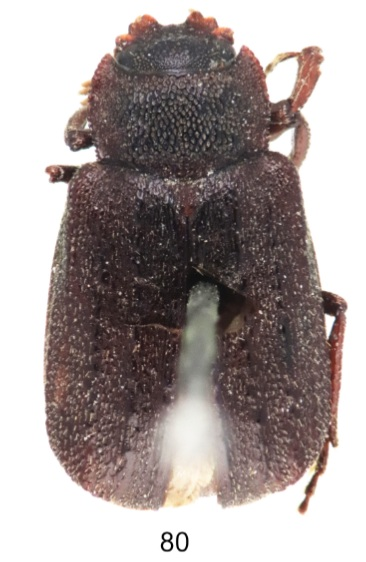

Scientific classification
- Kingdom: Animalia
- Phylum: Arthropoda
- Class: Insecta
- Order: Coleoptera
- Suborder: Polyphaga
- Infraorder: Scarabaeiformia
- Family: Scarabaeidae
- Genus: Maechidius
- Species: M. seriegranosus

Binomial name
- Maechidius seriegranosus Heller, 1914

= Maechidius seriegranosus =

Species of beetle

Maechidius seriegranosus is a species of beetle of the family Scarabaeidae. It is found in Papua New Guinea.

== Description ==
Adults reach a length of about 6.80 mm. The dorsum and venter are uniformly dark brown, while the appendages are paler brown.
