= Mailu =

Mailu may refer to:

- Mailu Island, in Central Province, Papua New Guinea
- Mailu language, a Papuan language of Papua New Guinea
- Mailu (email client), see list of mail server software
- Maechidius mailu, a species of beetle
- Cleopa Kilonzo Mailu (born 1956), Kenyan politician
- Samwel Mailu (born 1993), Kenyan long-distance runner

== See also ==
- Mailuan languages, a Papuan language family that includes Mailu
