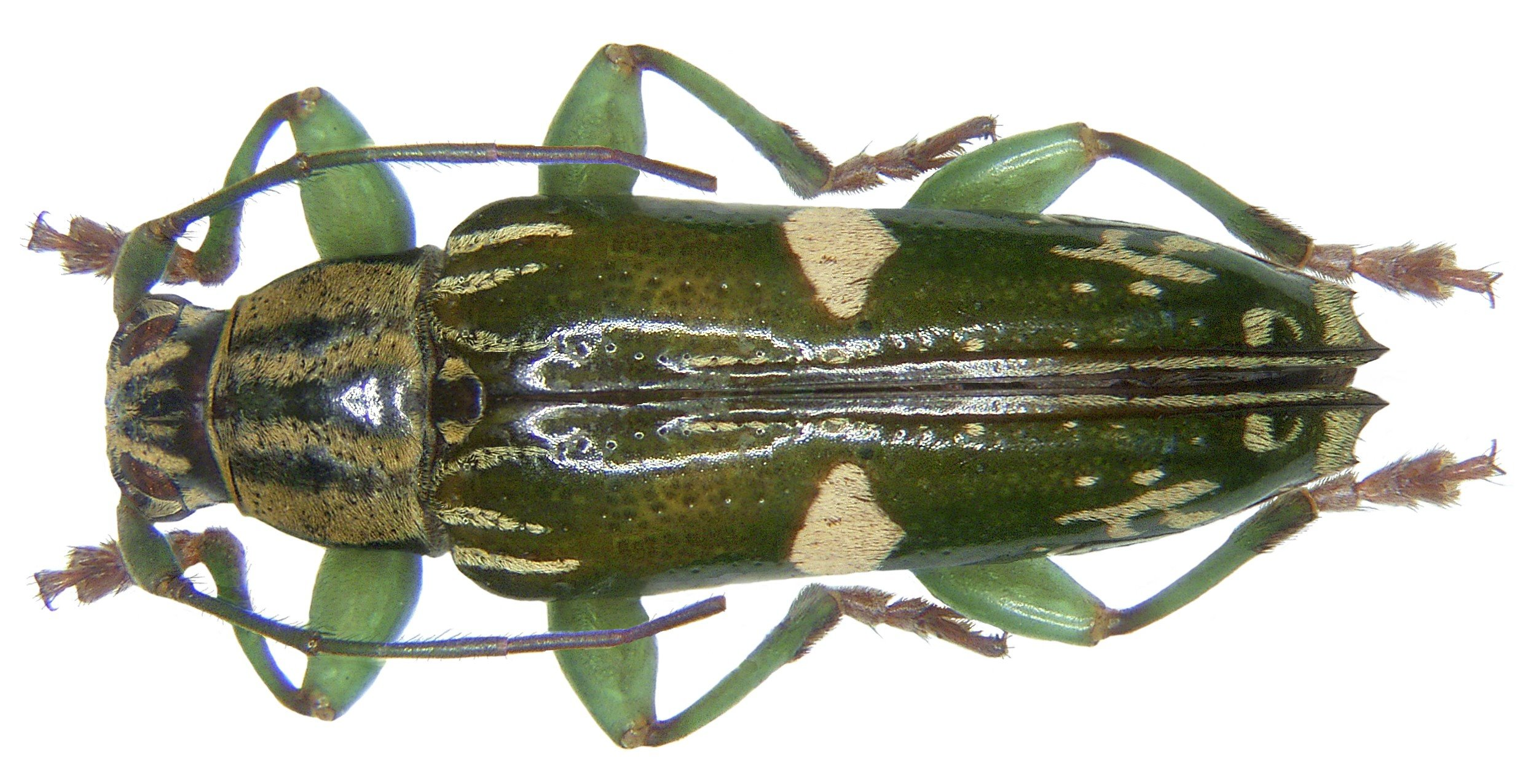

Scientific classification
- Domain: Eukaryota
- Kingdom: Animalia
- Phylum: Arthropoda
- Class: Insecta
- Order: Coleoptera
- Suborder: Polyphaga
- Infraorder: Cucujiformia
- Family: Cerambycidae
- Genus: Tmesisternus
- Species: T. prasinatus

Binomial name
- Tmesisternus prasinatus Heller, 1914

Synonyms
- Tmesisternus mediovittatus Breuning, 1973; Tmesisternus lucidus ? Breuning, 1966

= Tmesisternus prasinatus =

Species of beetle

Tmesisternus prasinatus is a species of beetle in the family Cerambycidae. It was described by Karl Borromaeus Maria Josef Heller in 1914. It is known from Papua New Guinea.
