= Oberea balineae =

Scientific classification
- Kingdom: Animalia
- Phylum: Arthropoda
- Class: Insecta
- Order: Coleoptera
- Suborder: Polyphaga
- Infraorder: Cucujiformia
- Family: Cerambycidae
- Genus: Oberea
- Species: O. balineae

Binomial name
- Oberea balineae Heller, 1915

Species of beetle

Oberea balineae is a species of flat-faced longhorn beetle in the tribe Saperdini. It was described by Karl Heller in 1915 based on specimens from Los Baños, the Philippines.
