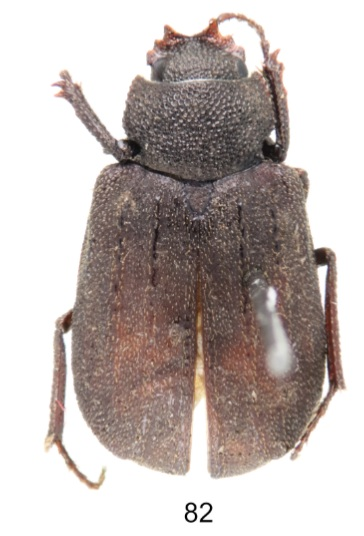

Scientific classification
- Kingdom: Animalia
- Phylum: Arthropoda
- Class: Insecta
- Order: Coleoptera
- Suborder: Polyphaga
- Infraorder: Scarabaeiformia
- Family: Scarabaeidae
- Genus: Maechidius
- Species: M. similis

Binomial name
- Maechidius similis Telnov, 2020

= Maechidius similis =

Species of beetle

Maechidius similis is a species of beetle of the family Scarabaeidae. It is found in Papua New Guinea, where it occurs at altitudes of 1080–1520 meters.

== Description ==
Adults reach a length of about 8.80–10.30 mm. The dorsum is uniformly black-brown, while the venter and appendages are brown.

== Etymology ==
The species name is derived from Latin similis (meaning similar) and refers to the similarity in external morphology to Maechidius subcostatus.
