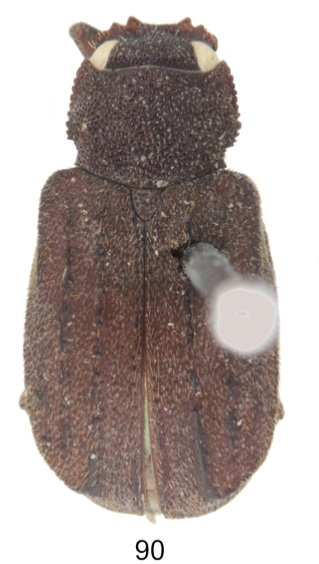

Scientific classification
- Kingdom: Animalia
- Phylum: Arthropoda
- Class: Insecta
- Order: Coleoptera
- Suborder: Polyphaga
- Infraorder: Scarabaeiformia
- Family: Scarabaeidae
- Genus: Maechidius
- Species: M. tarsalis

Binomial name
- Maechidius tarsalis Arrow, 1941

= Maechidius tarsalis =

Species of beetle

Maechidius tarsalis is a species of beetle of the family Scarabaeidae. It is found in Papua New Guinea.

== Description ==
The dorsum and venter are uniformly brown, while the margins of the labroclypeus and legs are somewhat paler.
