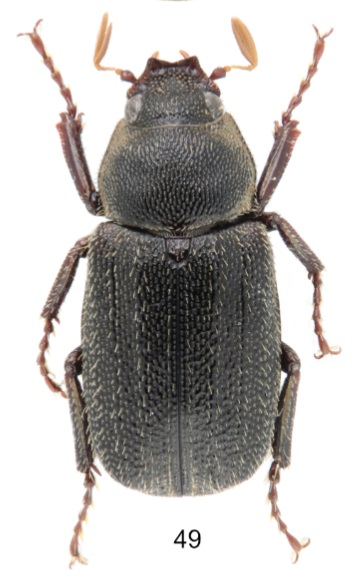

Scientific classification
- Kingdom: Animalia
- Phylum: Arthropoda
- Clade: Pancrustacea
- Class: Insecta
- Order: Coleoptera
- Suborder: Polyphaga
- Infraorder: Scarabaeiformia
- Family: Scarabaeidae
- Genus: Maechidius
- Species: M. konjo

Binomial name
- Maechidius konjo Telnov, 2020

= Maechidius konjo =

Species of beetle

Maechidius konjo is a species of beetle of the family Scarabaeidae. It is found in Indonesia (Sulawesi), where it occurs in lower to mid-montane mixed rainforests dominated by Pinus species.

== Description ==
Adults reach a length of about 6.90-7.30 mm. The dorsum and venter are uniformly black to black-brown, while the labroclypeus, antennae and legs are castaneous brown.

== Etymology ==
The species is named after Konjo, a group of South Sulawesi native languages (Coastal Konjo and Highland Konjo) spoken in the area where the species occurs.
