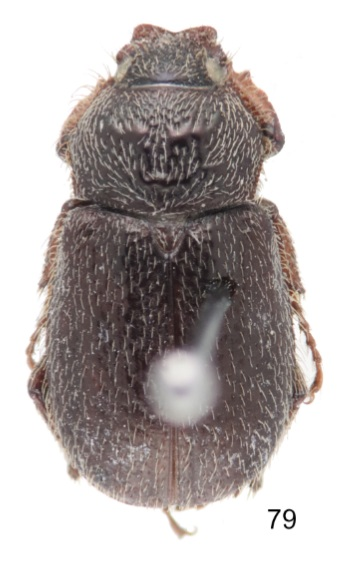

Scientific classification
- Kingdom: Animalia
- Phylum: Arthropoda
- Clade: Pancrustacea
- Class: Insecta
- Order: Coleoptera
- Suborder: Polyphaga
- Infraorder: Scarabaeiformia
- Family: Scarabaeidae
- Genus: Maechidius
- Species: M. rugicollis

Binomial name
- Maechidius rugicollis Moser, 1920

= Maechidius rugicollis =

Species of beetle

Maechidius rugicollis is a species of beetle of the family Scarabaeidae. It is found in Papua New Guinea.

== Description ==
Adults reach a length of about 6.90–9 mm. The dorsum and venter are uniformly black-brown, while the labroclypeus, antennae and legs are paler castaneous.
