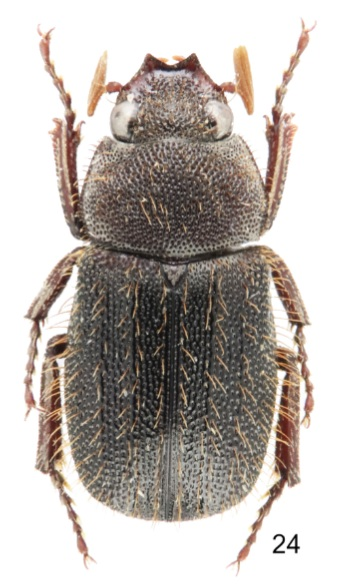

Scientific classification
- Kingdom: Animalia
- Phylum: Arthropoda
- Class: Insecta
- Order: Coleoptera
- Suborder: Polyphaga
- Infraorder: Scarabaeiformia
- Family: Scarabaeidae
- Genus: Maechidius
- Species: M. awu

Binomial name
- Maechidius awu Telnov, 2020

= Maechidius awu =

Species of beetle

Maechidius awu is a species of beetle of the family Scarabaeidae. It is found in Indonesia (Sangihe Islands).

== Description ==
Adults reach a length of about 5.30–7.05 mm. The dorsum is uniformly black to black-brown with a reddish brown labroclypeus, mouthparts, antennae, legs and all of the venter. The lateral margins of the pronotum and elytra, pronotal hypomera and venter have dense microscopical velvety pubescence in some specimens.

== Etymology ==
The species is named after Awu, the largest volcano on the Sangihe Islands.
