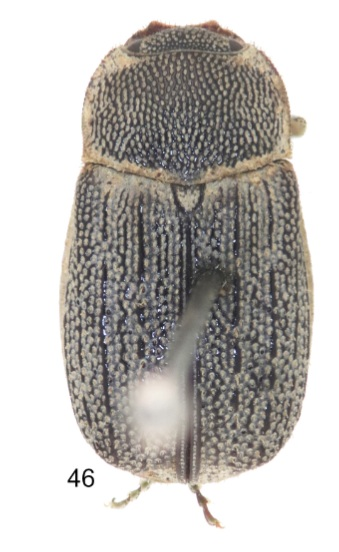

Scientific classification
- Kingdom: Animalia
- Phylum: Arthropoda
- Class: Insecta
- Order: Coleoptera
- Suborder: Polyphaga
- Infraorder: Scarabaeiformia
- Family: Scarabaeidae
- Genus: Maechidius
- Species: M. interruptocarinulatus

Binomial name
- Maechidius interruptocarinulatus Heller, 1914

= Maechidius interruptocarinulatus =

Species of beetle

Maechidius interruptocarinulatus is a species of beetle of the family Scarabaeidae. It is found in Indonesia (Irian Jaya).

== Description ==
Adults reach a length of about 7.40-8.60 mm. The dorsum and venter are uniformly black-brown, except for the brown appendages and labroclypeus.
