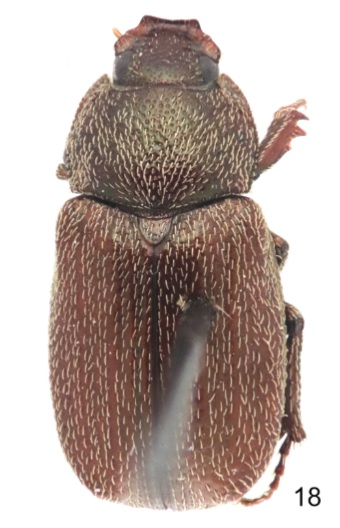

Scientific classification
- Kingdom: Animalia
- Phylum: Arthropoda
- Class: Insecta
- Order: Coleoptera
- Suborder: Polyphaga
- Infraorder: Scarabaeiformia
- Family: Scarabaeidae
- Genus: Maechidius
- Species: M. aenescens

Binomial name
- Maechidius aenescens Heller, 1910

= Maechidius aenescens =

Species of beetle

Maechidius aenescens is a species of beetle of the family Scarabaeidae. It is found in Papua New Guinea.

== Description ==
Adults reach a length of about 6-7.40 mm. The dorsum and venter are brown, the forebody with a slight green lustre. The head is flattened dorsally, somewhat depressed on either side at the anterior angle of the labroclypeus. They are slightly glossy dorsally and ventrally.
