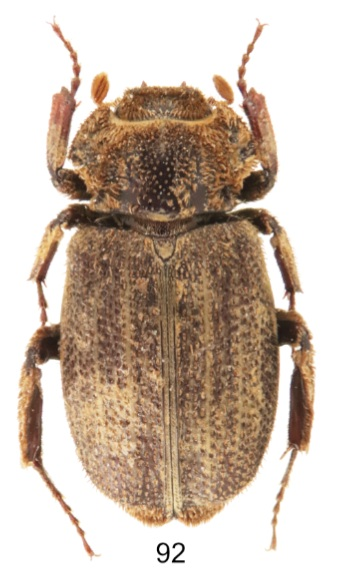

Scientific classification
- Kingdom: Animalia
- Phylum: Arthropoda
- Class: Insecta
- Order: Coleoptera
- Suborder: Polyphaga
- Infraorder: Scarabaeiformia
- Family: Scarabaeidae
- Genus: Maechidius
- Species: M. ursus

Binomial name
- Maechidius ursus Telnov, 2020

= Maechidius ursus =

Species of beetle

Maechidius ursus is a species of beetle of the family Scarabaeidae. It is found in Indonesia (Misool), where it occurs in primary lowland rainforests.

== Description ==
Adults reach a length of about 8.60 mm. The dorsum and venter are uniformly dark brown and covered with microscopical velvety pubescence. The mouthparts, antennae and legs are reddish brown.

== Etymology ==
The species name is derived from Latin ursus (meaning bear) and refers to the robust body and peculiar, dense, mammal-fur-like pubescence.
