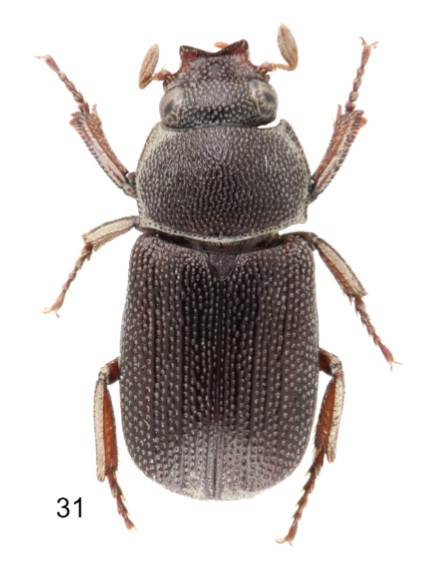

Scientific classification
- Kingdom: Animalia
- Phylum: Arthropoda
- Class: Insecta
- Order: Coleoptera
- Suborder: Polyphaga
- Infraorder: Scarabaeiformia
- Family: Scarabaeidae
- Genus: Maechidius
- Species: M. ciliatus

Binomial name
- Maechidius ciliatus Telnov, 2020

= Maechidius ciliatus =

Species of beetle

Maechidius ciliatus is a species of beetle of the family Scarabaeidae. It is found in Papua New Guinea, where it occurs in lowland rainforests.

== Description ==
Adults reach a length of about 6 mm. The dorsum is uniformly black-brown with brown labroclypeus, antennae, legs and venter.

== Etymology ==
The species name is derived from Latin cilium (meaning cilia) and refers to its apically ciliate parameres.
