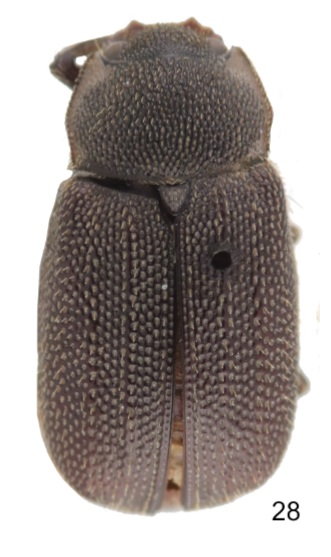

Scientific classification
- Kingdom: Animalia
- Phylum: Arthropoda
- Clade: Pancrustacea
- Class: Insecta
- Order: Coleoptera
- Suborder: Polyphaga
- Infraorder: Scarabaeiformia
- Family: Scarabaeidae
- Genus: Maechidius
- Species: M. boessnecki

Binomial name
- Maechidius boessnecki Telnov, 2020

= Maechidius boessnecki =

Species of beetle

Maechidius boessnecki is a species of beetle of the family Scarabaeidae. It is found in Indonesia (Sulawesi).

== Description ==
Adults reach a length of about 8.45 mm. The dorsum is black-brown, while the labroclypeus, antennae, legs and venter are brown. The head is glossy dorsally and slightly convex on the frons.

== Etymology ==
The species is named in honour of the malacologist Ulrich Bößneck.
