= Maechidius arcuatus =

Scientific classification
- Kingdom: Animalia
- Phylum: Arthropoda
- Class: Insecta
- Order: Coleoptera
- Suborder: Polyphaga
- Infraorder: Scarabaeiformia
- Family: Scarabaeidae
- Genus: Maechidius
- Species: M. arcuatus

Binomial name
- Maechidius arcuatus (Narakusumo & Balke, 2019)

Synonyms
- Epholcis arcuatus Narakusumo & Balke, 2019

Species of beetle

Maechidius arcuatus is a species of beetle of the family Scarabaeidae. It is found in Indonesia (Moluccas), where they occur in disturbed forests and vegetation along streams at altitudes from 50 to 200 meters.

== Description ==
Adults reach a length of about 6-7.5 mm. They have a dark brown, shiny body, with ferruginous legs.

== Life history ==
They have been reported feeding on the flowers of Syzigium aromaticum.

== Etymology ==
The species name is derived from Latin arcuatus (meaning bow shaped) and refers to the shape of the male metatibia.
