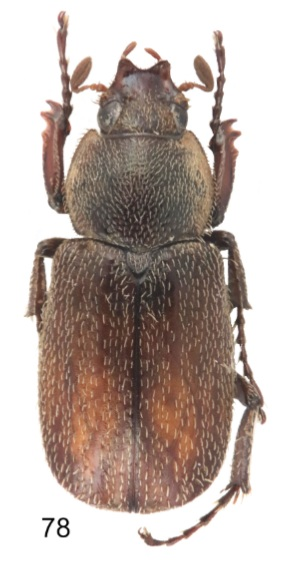

Scientific classification
- Kingdom: Animalia
- Phylum: Arthropoda
- Class: Insecta
- Order: Coleoptera
- Suborder: Polyphaga
- Infraorder: Scarabaeiformia
- Family: Scarabaeidae
- Genus: Maechidius
- Species: M. riedeli

Binomial name
- Maechidius riedeli Telnov, 2020

= Maechidius riedeli =

Species of beetle

Maechidius riedeli is a species of beetle of the family Scarabaeidae. It is found in Indonesia (Irian Jaya), where it occurs in lowland rainforests.

== Description ==
Adults reach a length of about 6.60 mm. The body is uniformly pale brown. The head is glossy dorsally and ventrally.

== Etymology ==
The species is named after its collector, Alexander Riedel.
