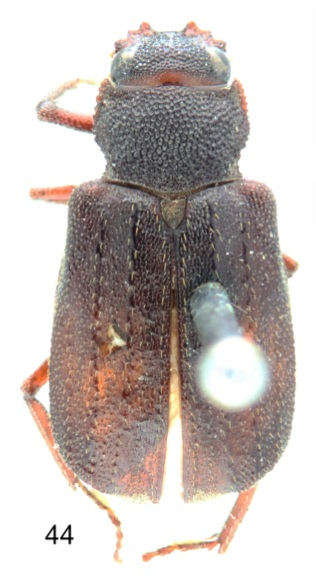

Scientific classification
- Kingdom: Animalia
- Phylum: Arthropoda
- Class: Insecta
- Order: Coleoptera
- Suborder: Polyphaga
- Infraorder: Scarabaeiformia
- Family: Scarabaeidae
- Genus: Maechidius
- Species: M. hirtipes

Binomial name
- Maechidius hirtipes Arrow, 1941

= Maechidius hirtipes =

Species of beetle

Maechidius hirtipes is a species of beetle of the family Scarabaeidae. It is found in Papua New Guinea.

== Description ==
The male labroclypeus is broadly deeply emarginate anteriorly, its lateral margins strongly sinuous in both dorsal and lateral views.
