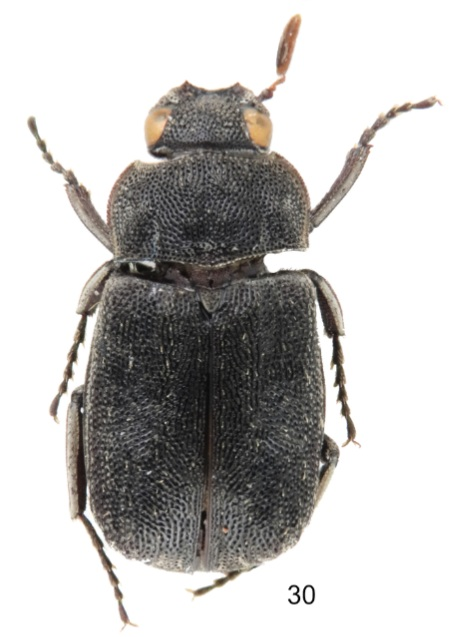

Scientific classification
- Kingdom: Animalia
- Phylum: Arthropoda
- Class: Insecta
- Order: Coleoptera
- Suborder: Polyphaga
- Infraorder: Scarabaeiformia
- Family: Scarabaeidae
- Genus: Maechidius
- Species: M. caperatus

Binomial name
- Maechidius caperatus Telnov, 2020

= Maechidius caperatus =

Species of beetle

Maechidius caperatus is a species of beetle of the family Scarabaeidae. It is found in Indonesia (Irian Jaya), where it occurs in lowland rainforests at about 750 meters altitude.

== Description ==
Adults reach a length of about 8.15 mm. The dorsum and venter are uniformly black, while the edges of the labroclypeus, legs and antennae are dark brown.

== Etymology ==
The species name is derived from Latin caperatus (meaning wrinkled) and refers to the irregularly wrinkled pattern of the pronotum and elytra.
