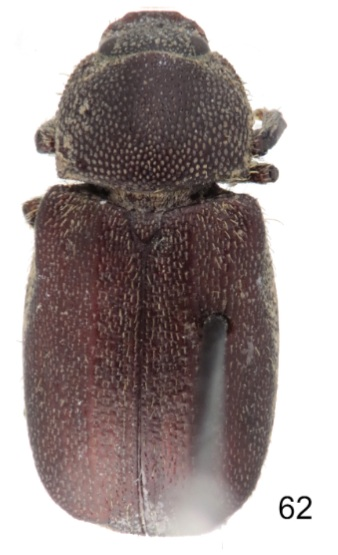

Scientific classification
- Kingdom: Animalia
- Phylum: Arthropoda
- Clade: Pancrustacea
- Class: Insecta
- Order: Coleoptera
- Suborder: Polyphaga
- Infraorder: Scarabaeiformia
- Family: Scarabaeidae
- Genus: Maechidius
- Species: M. papuanus

Binomial name
- Maechidius papuanus Moser, 1926

= Maechidius papuanus =

Species of beetle

Maechidius papuanus is a species of beetle of the family Scarabaeidae. It is found in Indonesia (Irian Jaya).

== Description ==
Adults reach a length of about 7.90 mm. They have uniformly brown body, with the labroclypeus and legs slightly paler.
