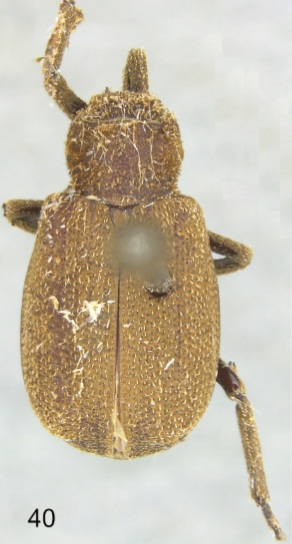

Scientific classification
- Kingdom: Animalia
- Phylum: Arthropoda
- Class: Insecta
- Order: Coleoptera
- Suborder: Polyphaga
- Infraorder: Scarabaeiformia
- Family: Scarabaeidae
- Genus: Maechidius
- Species: M. helleri

Binomial name
- Maechidius helleri (Frey, 1969)

Synonyms
- Paramaechidius helleri Frey, 1969

= Maechidius helleri =

Species of beetle

Maechidius helleri is a species of beetle of the family Scarabaeidae. It is found in Papua New Guinea.

== Description ==
The dorsum is covered with dense dirty yellow fur-like pubescence.
