= Maechidius moluccanus =

Scientific classification
- Kingdom: Animalia
- Phylum: Arthropoda
- Clade: Pancrustacea
- Class: Insecta
- Order: Coleoptera
- Suborder: Polyphaga
- Infraorder: Scarabaeiformia
- Family: Scarabaeidae
- Genus: Maechidius
- Species: M. moluccanus

Binomial name
- Maechidius moluccanus Moser, 1920

Synonyms
- Epholcis moluccanus

Species of beetle

Maechidius moluccanus is a species of beetle of the family Scarabaeidae. It is found in Indonesia (Seram Island).

== Description ==
Adults reach a length of about 6 mm. They have a ferruginous body.
