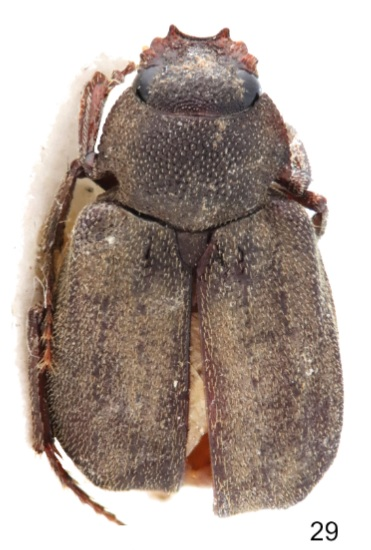

Scientific classification
- Kingdom: Animalia
- Phylum: Arthropoda
- Class: Insecta
- Order: Coleoptera
- Suborder: Polyphaga
- Infraorder: Scarabaeiformia
- Family: Scarabaeidae
- Genus: Maechidius
- Species: M. brocki

Binomial name
- Maechidius brocki Telnov, 2020

= Maechidius brocki =

Species of beetle

Maechidius brocki is a species of beetle of the family Scarabaeidae. It is found in Papua New Guinea.

== Description ==
Adults reach a length of about 8.25-9.25 mm. The dorsum and venter are uniformly black-brown, while the labroclypeus, mouthparts, and legs are castaneous.

== Etymology ==
The species is dedicated to Paul Brock, a famous phasmid expert.
