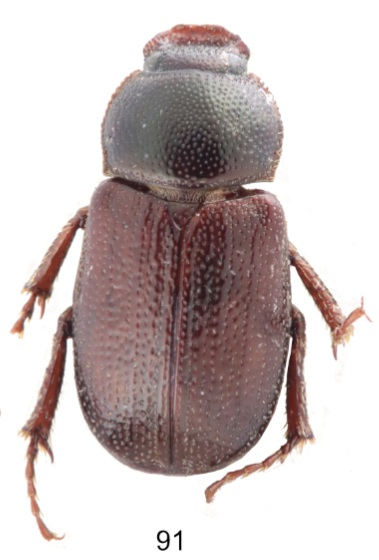

Scientific classification
- Kingdom: Animalia
- Phylum: Arthropoda
- Class: Insecta
- Order: Coleoptera
- Suborder: Polyphaga
- Infraorder: Scarabaeiformia
- Family: Scarabaeidae
- Genus: Maechidius
- Species: M. trivialis

Binomial name
- Maechidius trivialis Telnov, 2020

= Maechidius trivialis =

Species of beetle

Maechidius trivialis is a species of beetle of the family Scarabaeidae. It is found in Papua New Guinea, where it occurs in lowland rainforests.

== Description ==
Adults reach a length of about 6.10 mm. The dorsum and venter are brown, the forebody with an inconspicuous green lustre.

== Etymology ==
The species name is derived from Latin trivialis (meaning trivial or ordinary).
