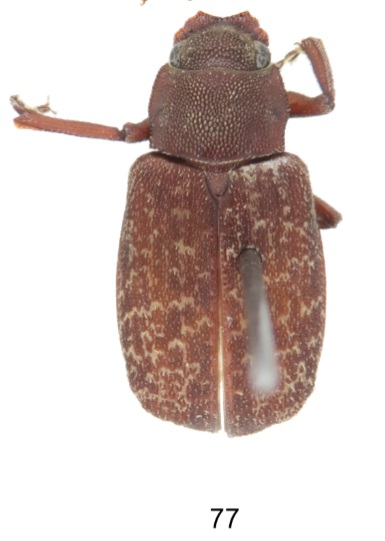
- Male
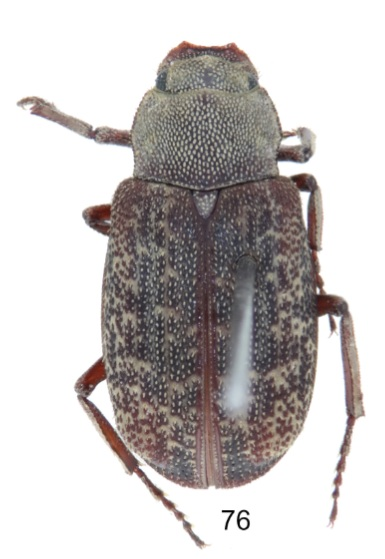
- Female

Scientific classification
- Kingdom: Animalia
- Phylum: Arthropoda
- Class: Insecta
- Order: Coleoptera
- Suborder: Polyphaga
- Infraorder: Scarabaeiformia
- Family: Scarabaeidae
- Genus: Maechidius
- Species: M. popei

Binomial name
- Maechidius popei (Frey, 1969)

Synonyms
- Paramaechidius popei Frey, 1969

= Maechidius popei =

Species of beetle

Maechidius popei is a species of beetle of the family Scarabaeidae. It is found in Papua New Guinea.

== Description ==
The dorsum is partly covered with microscopical velvety pubescence.
