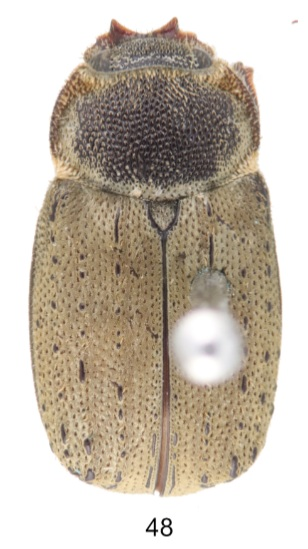

Scientific classification
- Kingdom: Animalia
- Phylum: Arthropoda
- Class: Insecta
- Order: Coleoptera
- Suborder: Polyphaga
- Infraorder: Scarabaeiformia
- Family: Scarabaeidae
- Genus: Maechidius
- Species: M. kazantsevi

Binomial name
- Maechidius kazantsevi Telnov, 2020

= Maechidius kazantsevi =

Species of beetle

Maechidius kazantsevi is a species of beetle of the family Scarabaeidae. It is found in Indonesia (Irian Jaya), where it occurs in lowland rainforests.

== Description ==
Adults reach a length of about 9.35 mm. The dorsum is uniformly dark brown with paler brown legs.

== Etymology ==
The species is named after Sergey Kazantsev, a specialist of Lycidae.
