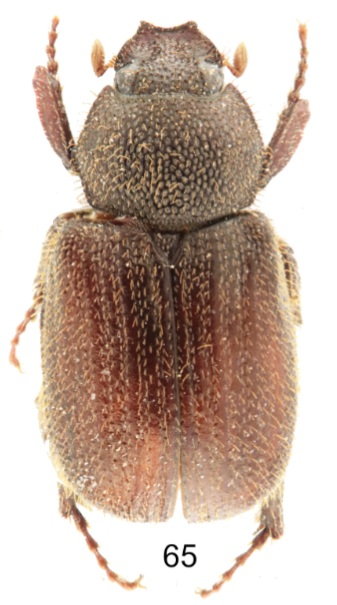

Scientific classification
- Kingdom: Animalia
- Phylum: Arthropoda
- Class: Insecta
- Order: Coleoptera
- Suborder: Polyphaga
- Infraorder: Scarabaeiformia
- Family: Scarabaeidae
- Genus: Maechidius
- Species: M. nepenthephilus

Binomial name
- Maechidius nepenthephilus Telnov, 2020

= Maechidius nepenthephilus =

Species of beetle

Maechidius nepenthephilus is a species of beetle of the family Scarabaeidae. It is found in Indonesia (Irian Jaya), where it occurs on nutrient-poor semidry slopes in eucalypt stands at altitudes around 150 meters.

== Description ==
Adults reach a length of about 6.70–7.70 mm. The dorsum is uniformly black-brown, while the labroclypeus, antennae, legs and venter are brown.

== Life history ==
Adults have been found on the flowers of Nepenthes species.

== Etymology ==
The species name is derived from a combination of Nepenthes and Greek philia (Ancient Greek for love and friendship), indicating the association of the imago with flowers of pitcher plants.
