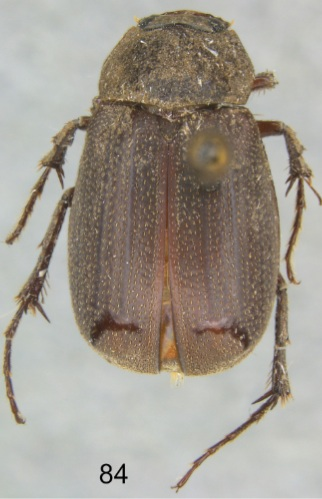

Scientific classification
- Kingdom: Animalia
- Phylum: Arthropoda
- Class: Insecta
- Order: Coleoptera
- Suborder: Polyphaga
- Infraorder: Scarabaeiformia
- Family: Scarabaeidae
- Genus: Maechidius
- Species: M. simplex

Binomial name
- Maechidius simplex Frey, 1969

= Maechidius simplex =

Species of beetle

Maechidius simplex is a species of beetle of the family Scarabaeidae. It is found in Indonesia (Irian Jaya).

== Description ==
They have a brown body, with the antennae and legs reddish-castaneous.
