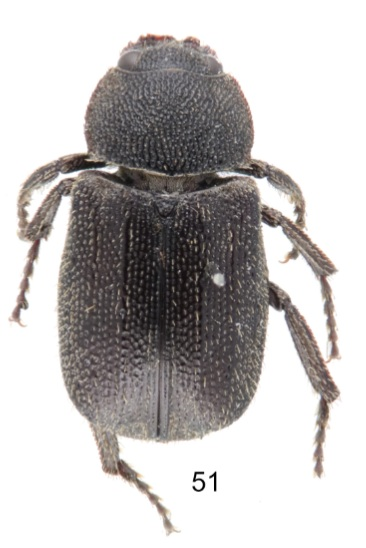

Scientific classification
- Kingdom: Animalia
- Phylum: Arthropoda
- Clade: Pancrustacea
- Class: Insecta
- Order: Coleoptera
- Suborder: Polyphaga
- Infraorder: Scarabaeiformia
- Family: Scarabaeidae
- Genus: Maechidius
- Species: M. legalovi

Binomial name
- Maechidius legalovi Telnov, 2020

= Maechidius legalovi =

Species of beetle

Maechidius legalovi is a species of beetle of the family Scarabaeidae. It is found in Indonesia (Sulawesi), where it occurs in lowland rainforests.

== Description ==
Adults reach a length of about 7.40 mm. The dorsum and venter are uniformly black, while the labroclypeus, anterior and lateral margins of the pronotum, mouthparts and legs are dark castaneous.

== Etymology ==
The species is named after the expert of Curculionoidea Andrei A. Legalov.
