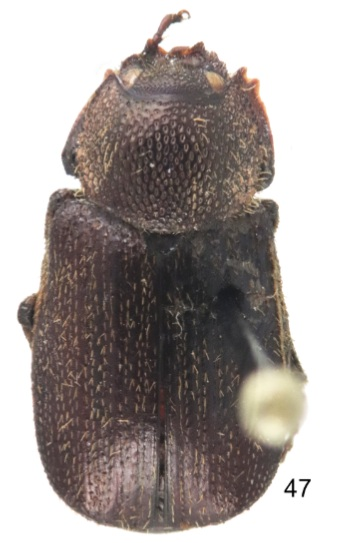

Scientific classification
- Kingdom: Animalia
- Phylum: Arthropoda
- Clade: Pancrustacea
- Class: Insecta
- Order: Coleoptera
- Suborder: Polyphaga
- Infraorder: Scarabaeiformia
- Family: Scarabaeidae
- Genus: Maechidius
- Species: M. jobiensis

Binomial name
- Maechidius jobiensis Moser, 1920

= Maechidius jobiensis =

Species of beetle

Maechidius jobiensis is a species of beetle of the family Scarabaeidae. It is found in Indonesia (Irian Jaya).

== Description ==
Adults reach a length of about 8.70–10 mm. The dorsum and venter are uniformly black-brown, while the appendages and labroclypeus are paler brown.
