= Maechidius tridentatus =

Scientific classification
- Kingdom: Animalia
- Phylum: Arthropoda
- Class: Insecta
- Order: Coleoptera
- Suborder: Polyphaga
- Infraorder: Scarabaeiformia
- Family: Scarabaeidae
- Genus: Maechidius
- Species: M. tridentatus

Binomial name
- Maechidius tridentatus Britton, 1963

Species of beetle

Maechidius tridentatus is a species of beetle of the family Scarabaeidae. It is found in Australia (Queensland).

== Description ==
Adults reach a length of about 8 mm. The head and pronotum are black, while the elytra, pygidium and ventral surface are very dark reddish brown. The legs, antennae and palpi are reddish brown.
