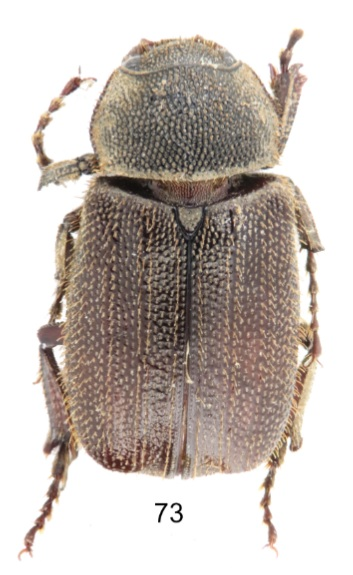

Scientific classification
- Kingdom: Animalia
- Phylum: Arthropoda
- Class: Insecta
- Order: Coleoptera
- Suborder: Polyphaga
- Infraorder: Scarabaeiformia
- Family: Scarabaeidae
- Genus: Maechidius
- Species: M. peregrinus

Binomial name
- Maechidius peregrinus Lansberge, 1886

= Maechidius peregrinus =

Species of beetle

Maechidius peregrinus is a species of beetle of the family Scarabaeidae. It is found in Indonesia (Sulawesi).

== Description ==
Adults reach a length of about 7.60–9.40 mm. The dorsum and venter are uniformly black-brown, while the labroclypeus, antennae and legs are brown.
