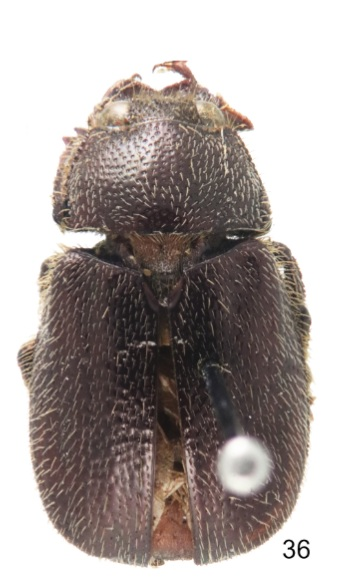

Scientific classification
- Kingdom: Animalia
- Phylum: Arthropoda
- Class: Insecta
- Order: Coleoptera
- Suborder: Polyphaga
- Infraorder: Scarabaeiformia
- Family: Scarabaeidae
- Genus: Maechidius
- Species: M. esau

Binomial name
- Maechidius esau Heller, 1914

Synonyms
- Maechidius setosellus Frey, 1969; Maechidius setosus Moser, 1920

= Maechidius esau =

Species of beetle

Maechidius esau is a species of beetle of the family Scarabaeidae. It is found in Papua New Guinea and Indonesia (Irian Jaya).

== Description ==
Adults reach a length of about 8.70–10.10 mm. The dorsum and venter are uniformly black or brown.
