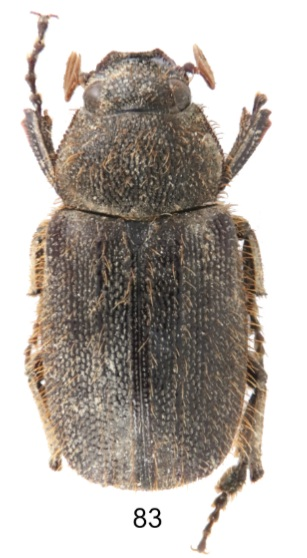

Scientific classification
- Kingdom: Animalia
- Phylum: Arthropoda
- Class: Insecta
- Order: Coleoptera
- Suborder: Polyphaga
- Infraorder: Scarabaeiformia
- Family: Scarabaeidae
- Genus: Maechidius
- Species: M. skalei

Binomial name
- Maechidius skalei Telnov, 2020

= Maechidius skalei =

Species of beetle

Maechidius skalei is a species of beetle of the family Scarabaeidae. It is found in Indonesia (Sulawesi), where it occurs in lowland rainforests.

== Description ==
Adults reach a length of about 7.30-8.67 mm. The dorsum and venter are uniformly black-brown, while the labroclypeus, antennae and legs are brown.

== Etymology ==
The species is named after its collector, André Skale.
