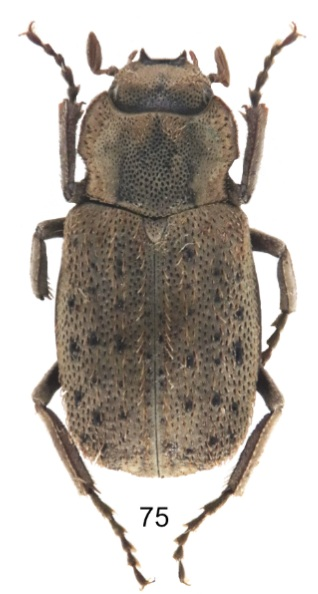

Scientific classification
- Kingdom: Animalia
- Phylum: Arthropoda
- Class: Insecta
- Order: Coleoptera
- Suborder: Polyphaga
- Infraorder: Scarabaeiformia
- Family: Scarabaeidae
- Genus: Maechidius
- Species: M. perlatus

Binomial name
- Maechidius perlatus (Frey, 1969)

Synonyms
- Paramaechidius perlatus Frey, 1969

= Maechidius perlatus =

Species of beetle

Maechidius perlatus is a species of beetle of the family Scarabaeidae. It is found in Papua New Guinea and Indonesia (Irian Jaya).

== Description ==
Adults reach a length of about 7.50–9 mm. The dorsum is uniformly black to black-brown, while the labroclypeus, mouthparts and antennae are castaneous brown.
