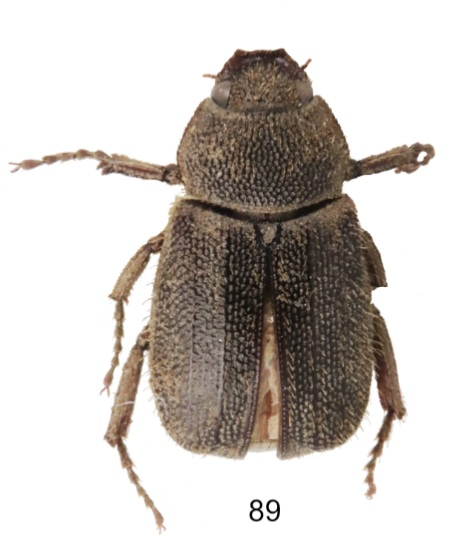

Scientific classification
- Kingdom: Animalia
- Phylum: Arthropoda
- Class: Insecta
- Order: Coleoptera
- Suborder: Polyphaga
- Infraorder: Scarabaeiformia
- Family: Scarabaeidae
- Genus: Maechidius
- Species: M. suwawa

Binomial name
- Maechidius suwawa Telnov, 2020

= Maechidius suwawa =

Species of beetle

Maechidius suwawa is a species of beetle of the family Scarabaeidae. It is found in Indonesia (Sulawesi), where it occurs in lowland rainforests.

== Description ==
Adults reach a length of about 6.70 mm. The dorsum is uniformly brown with the labroclypeus, mouthparts, legs and venter castaneous.

== Etymology ==
The species is named after Suwawa, one of the native languages spoken in the Bogani Nani Wartabone National park, northern Sulawesi.
