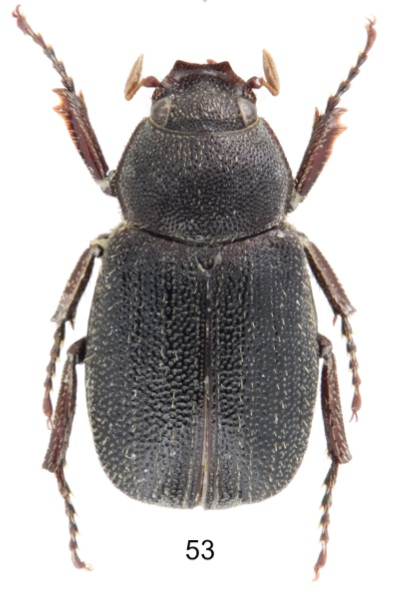

Scientific classification
- Kingdom: Animalia
- Phylum: Arthropoda
- Class: Insecta
- Order: Coleoptera
- Suborder: Polyphaga
- Infraorder: Scarabaeiformia
- Family: Scarabaeidae
- Genus: Maechidius
- Species: M. lineatopunctatus

Binomial name
- Maechidius lineatopunctatus Frey, 1969

= Maechidius lineatopunctatus =

Species of beetle

Maechidius lineatopunctatus is a species of beetle of the family Scarabaeidae. It is found in Papua New Guinea.

== Description ==
Adults reach a length of about 6.70 mm. The dorsum and venter are uniformly black-brown, while the appendages and labroclypeus is castaneous brown.
