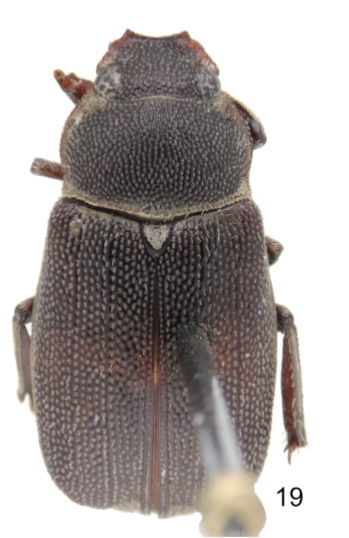

Scientific classification
- Kingdom: Animalia
- Phylum: Arthropoda
- Class: Insecta
- Order: Coleoptera
- Suborder: Polyphaga
- Infraorder: Scarabaeiformia
- Family: Scarabaeidae
- Genus: Maechidius
- Species: M. aiyura

Binomial name
- Maechidius aiyura Telnov, 2020

= Maechidius aiyura =

Species of beetle

Maechidius aiyura is a species of beetle of the family Scarabaeidae. It is found in Papua New Guinea. It occurs in lower montane rainforests.

== Description ==
Adults reach a length of about 9.15 mm. The dorsum is uniformly black-brown, while the venter, legs and labroclypeus are castaneous brown. The head is transverse, glossy dorsally and ventrally and flattened dorsally.

== Etymology ==
The species name is derived from the Aiyura Valley, the type locality.
