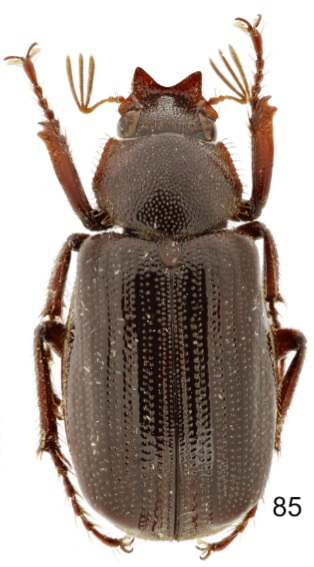

Scientific classification
- Kingdom: Animalia
- Phylum: Arthropoda
- Class: Insecta
- Order: Coleoptera
- Suborder: Polyphaga
- Infraorder: Scarabaeiformia
- Family: Scarabaeidae
- Genus: Maechidius
- Species: M. sougb

Binomial name
- Maechidius sougb Telnov, 2020

= Maechidius sougb =

Species of beetle

Maechidius sougb is a species of beetle of the family Scarabaeidae. It is found in Indonesia (Irian Jaya), where it occurs in primary mid-montane rainforests at about 2200 meters altitude.

== Description ==
Adults reach a length of about 9.70-10.05 mm. The dorsum and venter are uniformly dark castaneous, while the labroclypeus, mouthparts and legs are somewhat paler reddish brown.

== Etymology ==
The species is named after Sougb, the local name of one of the main tribes and languages in the Anggi Lakes area of the Arfak Mountains.
