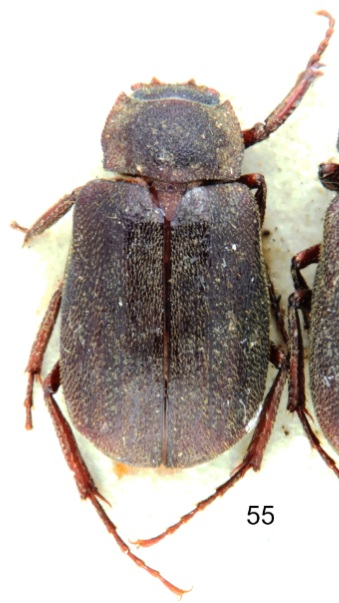

Scientific classification
- Kingdom: Animalia
- Phylum: Arthropoda
- Class: Insecta
- Order: Coleoptera
- Suborder: Polyphaga
- Infraorder: Scarabaeiformia
- Family: Scarabaeidae
- Genus: Maechidius
- Species: M. longipes

Binomial name
- Maechidius longipes Telnov, 2020

= Maechidius longipes =

Species of beetle

Maechidius longipes is a species of beetle of the family Scarabaeidae. It is found in Papua New Guinea.

== Description ==
Adults reach a length of about 7.35 mm. The dorsum and venter are uniformly brown, while the labroclypeus, antennae, legs and lateral margins of the pronotum are paler.

== Etymology ==
The species name is derived from Latin longipes (meaning long-legged) and refers to the conspicuously long tarsi of this species.
