= Maechidius acutus =

Scientific classification
- Kingdom: Animalia
- Phylum: Arthropoda
- Class: Insecta
- Order: Coleoptera
- Suborder: Polyphaga
- Infraorder: Scarabaeiformia
- Family: Scarabaeidae
- Genus: Maechidius
- Species: M. acutus

Binomial name
- Maechidius acutus (Narakusumo & Balke, 2019)

Synonyms
- Epholcis acutus Narakusumo & Balke, 2019

Species of beetle

Maechidius acutus is a species of beetle of the family Scarabaeidae. It is found in Indonesia (Moluccas).

== Description ==
Adults reach a length of about 6.1-6.9 mm. They have a dark brown, dull body, with ferruginous legs.

== Etymology ==
The species name is derived from Latin acutus (meaning pointed or acute) and refers to the distinct posterolateral angles at the pronotal base.
