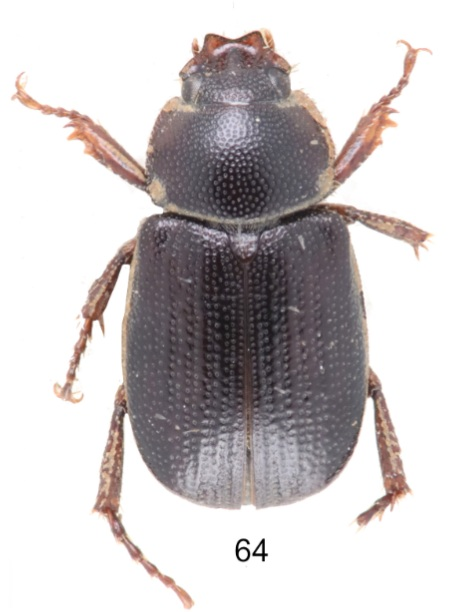

Scientific classification
- Kingdom: Animalia
- Phylum: Arthropoda
- Clade: Pancrustacea
- Class: Insecta
- Order: Coleoptera
- Suborder: Polyphaga
- Infraorder: Scarabaeiformia
- Family: Scarabaeidae
- Genus: Maechidius
- Species: M. nanus

Binomial name
- Maechidius nanus Arrow, 1941

= Maechidius nanus =

Species of beetle

Maechidius nanus is a species of beetle of the family Scarabaeidae. It is found in Indonesia (Waigeo).
