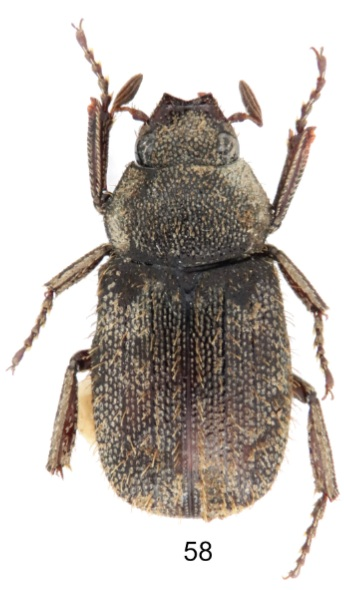

Scientific classification
- Kingdom: Animalia
- Phylum: Arthropoda
- Class: Insecta
- Order: Coleoptera
- Suborder: Polyphaga
- Infraorder: Scarabaeiformia
- Family: Scarabaeidae
- Genus: Maechidius
- Species: M. maleo

Binomial name
- Maechidius maleo Telnov, 2020

= Maechidius maleo =

Species of beetle

Maechidius maleo is a species of beetle of the family Scarabaeidae. It is found in Indonesia (Sulawesi), where it occurs in lowland up to mid-montane rainforests.

== Description ==
Adults reach a length of about 6.35-6.80 mm. The dorsum and venter are uniformly black-brown with, while the labroclypeus, antennae and legs are brown.

== Etymology ==
The species is named after the Maleo (Macrocephalon maleo), the enigmatic and endangered North Sulawesi endemic megapode.
