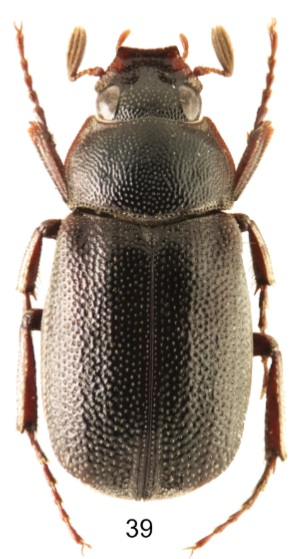

Scientific classification
- Kingdom: Animalia
- Phylum: Arthropoda
- Class: Insecta
- Order: Coleoptera
- Suborder: Polyphaga
- Infraorder: Scarabaeiformia
- Family: Scarabaeidae
- Genus: Maechidius
- Species: M. hamatus

Binomial name
- Maechidius hamatus Telnov, 2020

= Maechidius hamatus =

Species of beetle

Maechidius hamatus is a species of beetle of the family Scarabaeidae. It is found in Indonesia (Irian Jaya), where it occurs in mid-montane rainforests at about 2050 meters altitude.

== Description ==
Adults reach a length of about 7.10–7.90 mm. The dorsum is uniformly black-brown, while the labroclypeus, mouthparts, antennae, legs and most of the venter are reddish brown.

== Etymology ==
The species name is derived from Latin hamatus (meaning hooked) and refers to the curved denticles of male protarsomeres 1 and 2.
