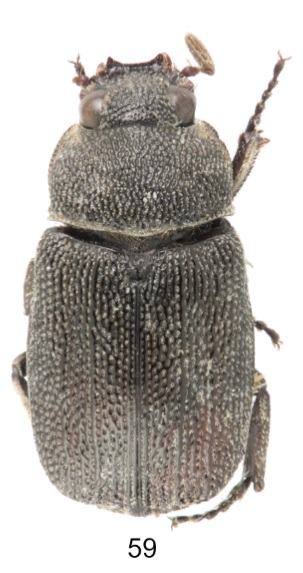

Scientific classification
- Kingdom: Animalia
- Phylum: Arthropoda
- Class: Insecta
- Order: Coleoptera
- Suborder: Polyphaga
- Infraorder: Scarabaeiformia
- Family: Scarabaeidae
- Genus: Maechidius
- Species: M. miklouhomaclayi

Binomial name
- Maechidius miklouhomaclayi Telnov, 2020

= Maechidius miklouhomaclayi =

Species of beetle

Maechidius miklouhomaclayi is a species of beetle of the family Scarabaeidae. It is found in Papua New Guinea.

== Description ==
Adults reach a length of about 6.60 mm. The dorsum and venter are uniformly black-brown, and the labroclypeus is castaneous brown.

== Etymology ==
The species is named in honour of Nicholas Miklouho-Maclay, a famous Russian explorer, ethnologist, anthropologist and biologist.
