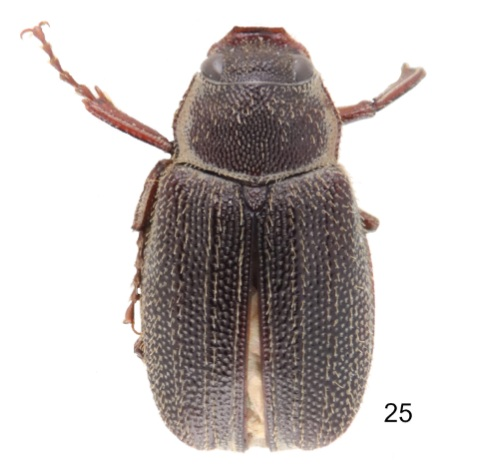

Scientific classification
- Kingdom: Animalia
- Phylum: Arthropoda
- Clade: Pancrustacea
- Class: Insecta
- Order: Coleoptera
- Suborder: Polyphaga
- Infraorder: Scarabaeiformia
- Family: Scarabaeidae
- Genus: Maechidius
- Species: M. babyrousa

Binomial name
- Maechidius babyrousa Telnov, 2020

= Maechidius babyrousa =

Species of beetle

Maechidius babyrousa is a species of beetle of the family Scarabaeidae. It is found in Indonesia (Sulawesi), where it occurs in lowland rainforests.

== Description ==
Adults reach a length of about 6.95–8.20 mm. The dorsum is uniformly black to black-brown (with the elytra somewhat paler brown than the forebody). The labroclypeus, mouthparts, legs and venter are castaneous.

== Etymology ==
The species is named after Babyrousa, a genus of enigmatic Suidae endemic to Sulawesi and the Moluccas.
