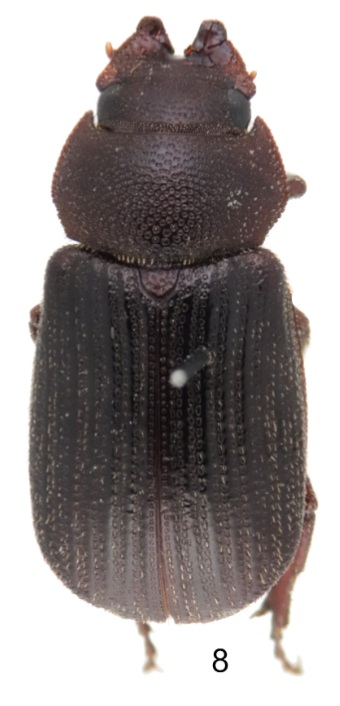

Scientific classification
- Kingdom: Animalia
- Phylum: Arthropoda
- Clade: Pancrustacea
- Class: Insecta
- Order: Coleoptera
- Suborder: Polyphaga
- Infraorder: Scarabaeiformia
- Family: Scarabaeidae
- Genus: Maechidius
- Species: M. divergens

Binomial name
- Maechidius divergens (Waterhouse, 1875)

Synonyms
- Epholcis divergens Waterhouse, 1875; Maechidius albertisi Fairmaire, 1877

= Maechidius divergens =

Species of beetle

Maechidius divergens is a species of beetle of the family Scarabaeidae. It is found in Australia (Queensland).

== Description ==
They are pitchy, with the forehead, the disc of the thorax and the elytra darker. The head is large, and has punctures that form irregular, transverse, short lines. The sides of the thorax are somewhat angular behind the middle and the posterior angles are somewhat obtuse. The elytra are closely covered with rows of setiferous punctures. Each puncture has at its base a minute shining tubercle, and the interstices are extremely narrow, except the third, fifth and seventh, which appear as narrow, irregular, shining costae.
