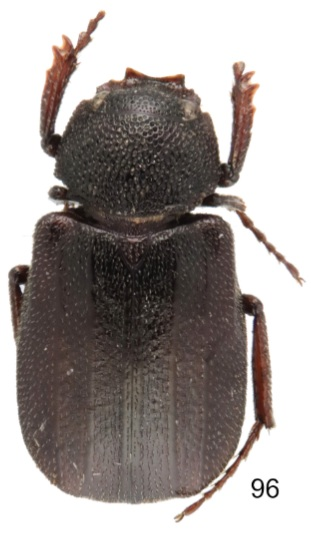

Scientific classification
- Kingdom: Animalia
- Phylum: Arthropoda
- Class: Insecta
- Order: Coleoptera
- Suborder: Polyphaga
- Infraorder: Scarabaeiformia
- Family: Scarabaeidae
- Genus: Maechidius
- Species: M. yamdena

Binomial name
- Maechidius yamdena Telnov, 2020

= Maechidius yamdena =

Species of beetle

Maechidius yamdena is a species of beetle of the family Scarabaeidae. It is found in Indonesia (Tanimbar).

== Description ==
Adults reach a length of about 8.05–9.20 mm. The dorsum and venter are uniformly black-brown, while the labroclypeus, mouthparts, antennae, tibiae and tarsi are reddish brown.

== Etymology ==
The species is named after the Yamdena, the main tribe and language of the main island in the Tanimbar group.
