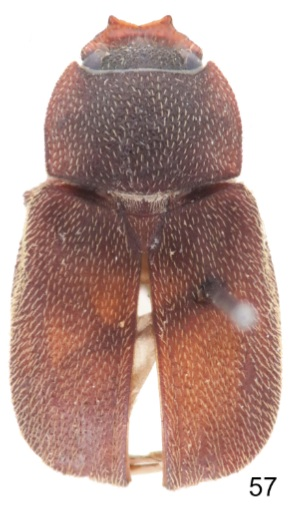

Scientific classification
- Kingdom: Animalia
- Phylum: Arthropoda
- Class: Insecta
- Order: Coleoptera
- Suborder: Polyphaga
- Infraorder: Scarabaeiformia
- Family: Scarabaeidae
- Genus: Maechidius
- Species: M. luniceps

Binomial name
- Maechidius luniceps Fairmaire, 1883

= Maechidius luniceps =

Species of beetle

Maechidius luniceps is a species of beetle of the family Scarabaeidae. It is found in Papua New Guinea.

== Description ==
The dorsum is uniformly brown to black-brown, while the venter and appendages are somewhat paler.
