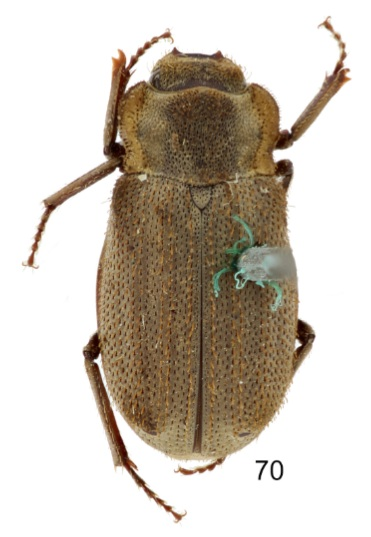

Scientific classification
- Kingdom: Animalia
- Phylum: Arthropoda
- Class: Insecta
- Order: Coleoptera
- Suborder: Polyphaga
- Infraorder: Scarabaeiformia
- Family: Scarabaeidae
- Genus: Maechidius
- Species: M. opatroides

Binomial name
- Maechidius opatroides Arrow, 1941

Synonyms
- Paramaechidius opatroides (Arrow, 1941)

= Maechidius opatroides =

Species of beetle

Maechidius opatroides is a species of beetle of the family Scarabaeidae. It is found in Indonesia (Waigeo).

== Description ==
The dorsum is densely covered with dirty yellowish microscopical velvety pubescence.
