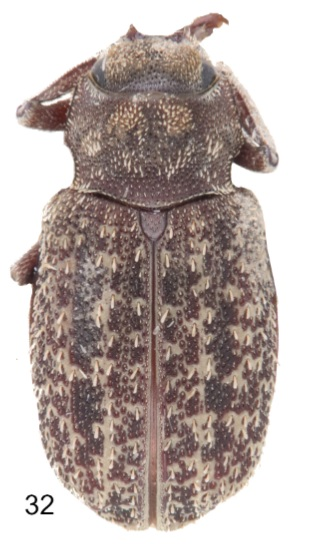

Scientific classification
- Kingdom: Animalia
- Phylum: Arthropoda
- Class: Insecta
- Order: Coleoptera
- Suborder: Polyphaga
- Infraorder: Scarabaeiformia
- Family: Scarabaeidae
- Genus: Maechidius
- Species: M. crypticus

Binomial name
- Maechidius crypticus Telnov, 2020

= Maechidius crypticus =

Species of beetle

Maechidius crypticus is a species of beetle of the family Scarabaeidae. It is found in Papua New Guinea, where it occurs in lower montane rainforests at about 1220 meters altitude.

== Description ==
Adults reach a length of about 6.5 mm. They are nearly identical to Maechidius lapsus, Maechidius owenstanleyi and Maechidius pauxillus.

== Etymology ==
The species name is derived from Greek κρυπτός (meaning cryptic) and refers to its strong external similarity to several Papuan congeners.
