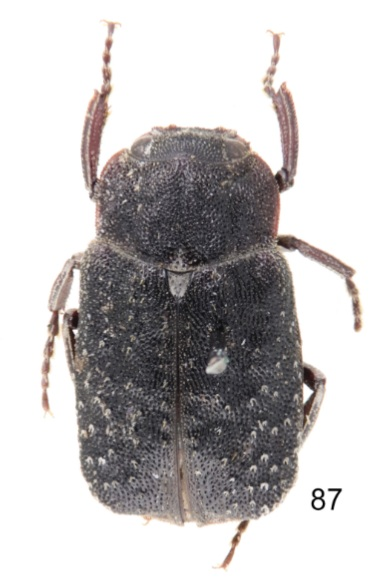

Scientific classification
- Kingdom: Animalia
- Phylum: Arthropoda
- Class: Insecta
- Order: Coleoptera
- Suborder: Polyphaga
- Infraorder: Scarabaeiformia
- Family: Scarabaeidae
- Genus: Maechidius
- Species: M. sturnus

Binomial name
- Maechidius sturnus Arrow, 1941

= Maechidius sturnus =

Species of beetle

Maechidius sturnus is a species of beetle of the family Scarabaeidae. It is found in Indonesia (Yapen).

== Description ==
The dorsum and venter are uniformly black, while the edges of the labroclypeus, lateral margins of the pronotum, legs and antennae are brown.
