= Maechidius obiensis =

Scientific classification
- Kingdom: Animalia
- Phylum: Arthropoda
- Class: Insecta
- Order: Coleoptera
- Suborder: Polyphaga
- Infraorder: Scarabaeiformia
- Family: Scarabaeidae
- Genus: Maechidius
- Species: M. obiensis

Binomial name
- Maechidius obiensis (Narakusumo & Balke, 2019)

Synonyms
- Epholcis obiensis Narakusumo & Balke, 2019

Species of beetle

Maechidius obiensis is a species of beetle of the family Scarabaeidae. It is found in Indonesia (Moluccas).

== Description ==
Adults reach a length of about 4.4–5.5 mm. They have a light brown body.

== Etymology ==
The species name refers to the type locality, Obi Island.
