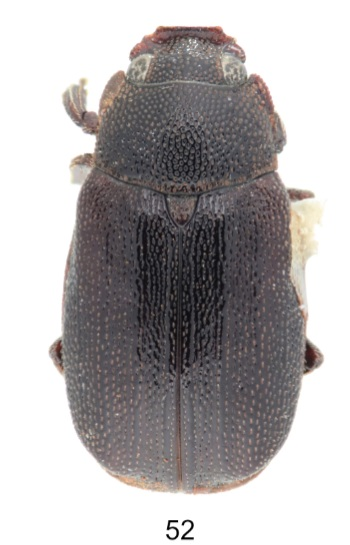

Scientific classification
- Kingdom: Animalia
- Phylum: Arthropoda
- Class: Insecta
- Order: Coleoptera
- Suborder: Polyphaga
- Infraorder: Scarabaeiformia
- Family: Scarabaeidae
- Genus: Maechidius
- Species: M. leucopsar

Binomial name
- Maechidius leucopsar Telnov, 2020

= Maechidius leucopsar =

Species of beetle

Maechidius leucopsar is a species of beetle of the family Scarabaeidae. It is found in Indonesia (Bali), where it occurs in lowland rainforests.

== Description ==
Adults reach a length of about 6.60 mm. The dorsum is uniformly black, while the labroclypeus, mouthparts, antennae, legs and all of the venter are reddish brown.

== Etymology ==
The species is named after Leucopsar, the monotypical sturnid genus of the famous and critically endangered Bali endemic Leucopsar rothschildi, widely known as the Bali myna, Rothschild's mynah, or Bali starling.
