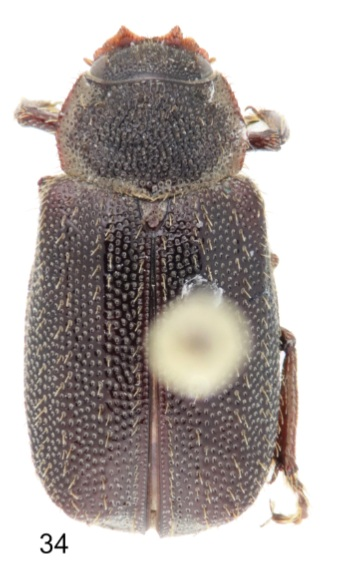

Scientific classification
- Kingdom: Animalia
- Phylum: Arthropoda
- Clade: Pancrustacea
- Class: Insecta
- Order: Coleoptera
- Suborder: Polyphaga
- Infraorder: Scarabaeiformia
- Family: Scarabaeidae
- Genus: Maechidius
- Species: M. deltouri

Binomial name
- Maechidius deltouri Telnov, 2020

= Maechidius deltouri =

Species of beetle

Maechidius deltouri is a species of beetle of the family Scarabaeidae. It is found in Indonesia (Sulawesi), where it occurs in lowland rainforests.

== Description ==
Adults reach a length of about 8.45 mm. The dorsum is uniformly brown, while the labroclypeus, mouthparts, legs and venter are castaneous.

== Etymology ==
The species is named after Gaёtan Deltour to commemorate his efforts in the conservation of Sulawesi biodiversity.
