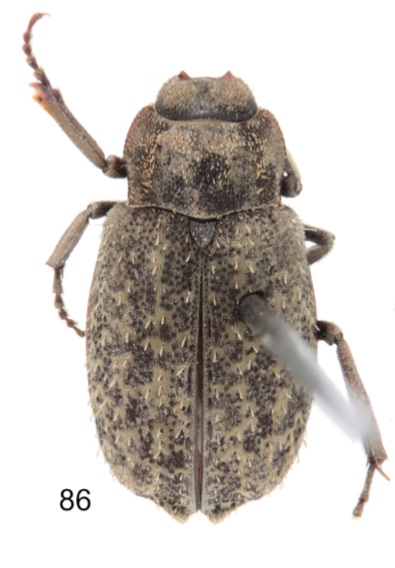

Scientific classification
- Kingdom: Animalia
- Phylum: Arthropoda
- Class: Insecta
- Order: Coleoptera
- Suborder: Polyphaga
- Infraorder: Scarabaeiformia
- Family: Scarabaeidae
- Genus: Maechidius
- Species: M. speciosus

Binomial name
- Maechidius speciosus (Frey, 1969)

Synonyms
- Paramaechidius speciosus Frey, 1969

= Maechidius speciosus =

Species of beetle

Maechidius speciosus is a species of beetle of the family Scarabaeidae. It is found in Papua New Guinea.

== Description ==
The dorsum and venter are covered with microscopical velvety pubescence.
