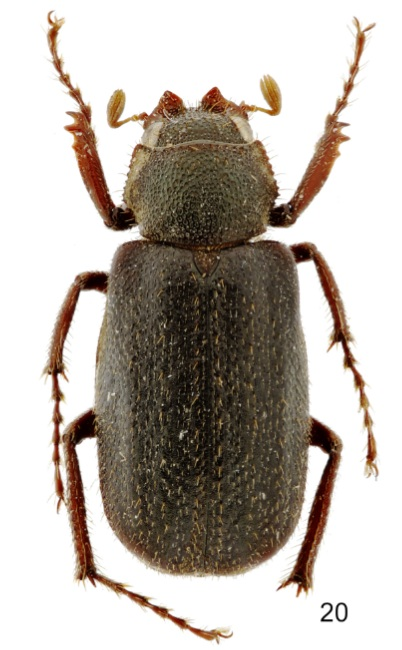

Scientific classification
- Kingdom: Animalia
- Phylum: Arthropoda
- Clade: Pancrustacea
- Class: Insecta
- Order: Coleoptera
- Suborder: Polyphaga
- Infraorder: Scarabaeiformia
- Family: Scarabaeidae
- Genus: Maechidius
- Species: M. alesbezdeki

Binomial name
- Maechidius alesbezdeki Telnov, 2020

= Maechidius alesbezdeki =

Species of beetle

Maechidius alesbezdeki is a species of beetle of the family Scarabaeidae. It is found in Indonesia (Irian Jaya). It occurs in primary mid-montane rainforests at altitudes of about 2200 meters.

== Description ==
Adults reach a length of about 8.67 mm. The dorsum is black-brown with a castaneous labroclypeus, anterior and lateral margins of the pronotum, mouthparts and legs. The venter is uniformly dark castaneous brown.

== Etymology ==
The species is named after the Scarabaeidae expert Aleš Bezděk.
