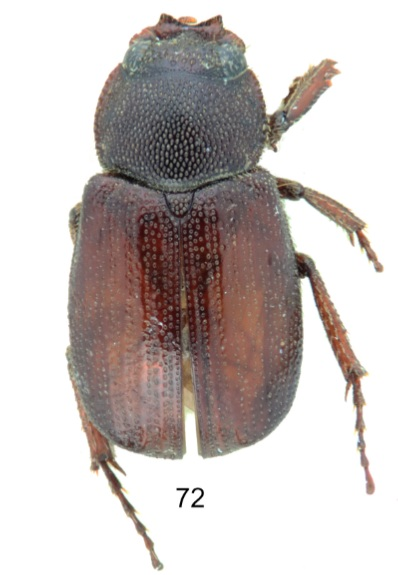

Scientific classification
- Kingdom: Animalia
- Phylum: Arthropoda
- Class: Insecta
- Order: Coleoptera
- Suborder: Polyphaga
- Infraorder: Scarabaeiformia
- Family: Scarabaeidae
- Genus: Maechidius
- Species: M. pedarioides

Binomial name
- Maechidius pedarioides Arrow, 1941

= Maechidius pedarioides =

Species of beetle

Maechidius pedarioides is a species of beetle of the family Scarabaeidae. It is found in Indonesia (Waigeo).
