= Maechidius =

Scientific classification
- Kingdom: Animalia
- Phylum: Arthropoda
- Class: Insecta
- Order: Coleoptera
- Suborder: Polyphaga
- Infraorder: Scarabaeiformia
- Family: Scarabaeidae
- Subfamily: Sericoidinae
- Tribe: Maechidiini
- Genus: Maechidius; MacLeay, 1819

Synonyms
- Paramaechidius Frey, 1969; Epholcis Waterhouse, 1875; Geobatus Dejean, 1833

Genus of leaf beetles

Maechidius is a genus of beetles belonging to the family Scarabaeidae.

== Species ==
- Maechidius acutus (Narakusumo & Balke, 2019)
- Maechidius addarcis Prokofiev, 2022
- Maechidius aenescens Heller, 1910
- Maechidius agnellus (Prokofiev, 2018)
- Maechidius aiyura Telnov, 2020
- Maechidius alesbezdeki Telnov, 2020
- Maechidius algonus Britton, 1957
- Maechidius amanus Britton, 1957
- Maechidius angusticeps Arrow, 1941
- Maechidius antennalis Blackburn, 1898
- Maechidius arcuatus (Narakusumo & Balke, 2019)
- Maechidius aroae Heller, 1914
- Maechidius astrolabius Prokofiev, 2022
- Maechidius ater Waterhouse, 1875
- Maechidius atratus Burmeister, 1855
- Maechidius awu Telnov, 2020
- Maechidius babyrousa Telnov, 2020
- Maechidius bidentulus Fairmaire, 1877
- Maechidius bilobiceps Fairmaire, 1877
- Maechidius bintang Telnov, 2020
- Maechidius boessnecki Telnov, 2020
- Maechidius bombycinus Prokofiev, 2022
- Maechidius brevis Waterhouse, 1875
- Maechidius brocki Telnov, 2020
- Maechidius caesius Britton, 1957
- Maechidius cakalele (Narakusumo & Balke, 2019)
- Maechidius calabyi Britton, 1957
- Maechidius caperatus Telnov, 2020
- Maechidius capitalis Blackburn, 1907
- Maechidius caviceps Blackburn, 1888
- Maechidius cavus Britton, 1957
- Maechidius chadwicki Britton, 1957
- Maechidius charaxus Britton, 1957
- Maechidius ciliatus Telnov, 2020
- Maechidius clypealis Blackburn, 1894
- Maechidius coelus Britton, 1957
- Maechidius conspicuus Lea, 1917
- Maechidius corrosus Waterhouse, 1875
- Maechidius crassifrons Britton, 1957
- Maechidius crenaticollis Blackburn, 1888
- Maechidius crypticus Telnov, 2020
- Maechidius dani Telnov, 2020
- Maechidius davidsoni Britton, 1957
- Maechidius deltouri Telnov, 2020
- Maechidius dendrolagus Telnov, 2020
- Maechidius divergens (Waterhouse, 1875)
- Maechidius echinoides Prokofiev, 2022
- Maechidius emarginatus Waterhouse, 1875
- Maechidius esau Heller, 1914
- Maechidius eutermiphilus Lea, 1924
- Maechidius excisicollis Blackburn, 1898
- Maechidius excisus Waterhouse, 1875
- Maechidius fissiceps MacLeay, 1888
- Maechidius fraterculus Moser, 1920
- Maechidius froggatti MacLeay, 1888
- Maechidius geminus Britton, 1957
- Maechidius gibbicollis Blackburn, 1898
- Maechidius gracilis Waterhouse, 1875
- Maechidius gressitti Frey, 1969
- Maechidius hackeri Lea, 1919
- Maechidius hamatus Telnov, 2020
- Maechidius helleri (Frey, 1969)
- Maechidius heterosquamosus Heller, 1910
- Maechidius hirtipes Arrow, 1941
- Maechidius hopianus Westwood, 1842
- Maechidius hoplocephalus Lea, 1917
- Maechidius humeralis Heller, 1914
- Maechidius insularis Lea, 1917
- Maechidius interruptocarinulatus Heller, 1914
- Maechidius jobiensis Moser, 1920
- Maechidius kainantu Telnov, 2025
- Maechidius kanallus Britton, 1957
- Maechidius kazantsevi Telnov, 2020
- Maechidius kiwanus Britton, 1957
- Maechidius konandus Britton, 1957
- Maechidius konjo Telnov, 2020
- Maechidius kurantus Britton, 1957
- Maechidius lapsus Telnov, 2020
- Maechidius lateripennis Lea, 1917
- Maechidius latus Waterhouse, 1875
- Maechidius legalovi Telnov, 2020
- Maechidius leucopsar Telnov, 2020
- Maechidius lineatopunctatus Frey, 1969
- Maechidius lobaticeps Frey, 1969
- Maechidius longior (Blackburn, 1898)
- Maechidius longipes Telnov, 2020
- Maechidius longitarsis Waterhouse, 1875
- Maechidius luniceps Fairmaire, 1883
- Maechidius macleaynus Westwood, 1845
- Maechidius macrosoma Prokofiev, 2022
- Maechidius mailu Telnov, 2020
- Maechidius major Blackburn, 1888
- Maechidius maleo Telnov, 2020
- Maechidius mellianus Westwood, 1842
- Maechidius merdeka Telnov, 2020
- Maechidius metellus Britton, 1957
- Maechidius miklouhomaclayi Telnov, 2020
- Maechidius milkappus Britton, 1957
- Maechidius milneanus Heller, 1914
- Maechidius modicus Blackburn, 1898
- Maechidius moluccanus Moser, 1920
- Maechidius muticus Arrow, 1941
- Maechidius nanus Arrow, 1941
- Maechidius nepenthephilus Telnov, 2020
- Maechidius obiensis (Narakusumo & Balke, 2019)
- Maechidius occidentalis Britton, 1957
- Maechidius olor Britton, 1957
- Maechidius opatroides Arrow, 1941
- Maechidius ordensis Blackburn, 1898
- Maechidius owenstanleyi Telnov, 2020
- Maechidius papuanus Moser, 1926
- Maechidius parallelicollis Moser, 1920
- Maechidius parandus Britton, 1957
- Maechidius parvulus MacLeay, 1871
- Maechidius paupianus Heller, 1910
- Maechidius pauxillus Heller, 1910
- Maechidius pedarioides Arrow, 1941
- Maechidius pellus Britton, 1957
- Maechidius penicilliger Prokofiev, 2022
- Maechidius peregrinus Lansberge, 1886
- Maechidius perlatus (Frey, 1969)
- Maechidius pilosus Blackburn, 1891
- Maechidius popei (Frey, 1969)
- Maechidius proximus Britton, 1957
- Maechidius puncticollis Lea, 1924
- Maechidius pygidialis Britton, 1957
- Maechidius raucus Blackburn, 1907
- Maechidius relictus Blackburn, 1907
- Maechidius riedeli Telnov, 2020
- Maechidius rufus Westwood, 1842
- Maechidius rugicollis Moser, 1920
- Maechidius rugosicollis MacLeay, 1871
- Maechidius rugosipes Blackburn, 1888
- Maechidius sabatinellii Telnov, 2025
- Maechidius savagei Lea, 1917
- Maechidius seriegranosus Heller, 1914
- Maechidius seriepunctatus Moser, 1920
- Maechidius serratus Britton, 1957
- Maechidius similis Telnov, 2020
- Maechidius simplex Frey, 1969
- Maechidius skalei Telnov, 2020
- Maechidius sordidus (Boisduval, 1835)
- Maechidius sougb Telnov, 2020
- Maechidius speciosus (Frey, 1969)
- Maechidius spurius (Kirby, 1819)
- Maechidius squamipennis Lea, 1917
- Maechidius stradbrokensis Lea, 1919
- Maechidius sturnus Arrow, 1941
- Maechidius subcostatus Brenske, 1895
- Maechidius suwawa Telnov, 2020
- Maechidius tarsalis Arrow, 1941
- Maechidius telnovi Prokofiev, 2022
- Maechidius tibialis Blackburn, 1892
- Maechidius tridentatus Britton, 1963
- Maechidius trivialis Telnov, 2020
- Maechidius tumidifrons Britton, 1957
- Maechidius uniformis (Britton, 1957)
- Maechidius ursus Telnov, 2020
- Maechidius variolosus MacLeay, 1871
- Maechidius vicinus Heller, 1914
- Maechidius weigeli Telnov, 2020
- Maechidius wilsoni Britton, 1957
- Maechidius woodlarkianus Heller, 1914
- Maechidius yamdena Telnov, 2020
