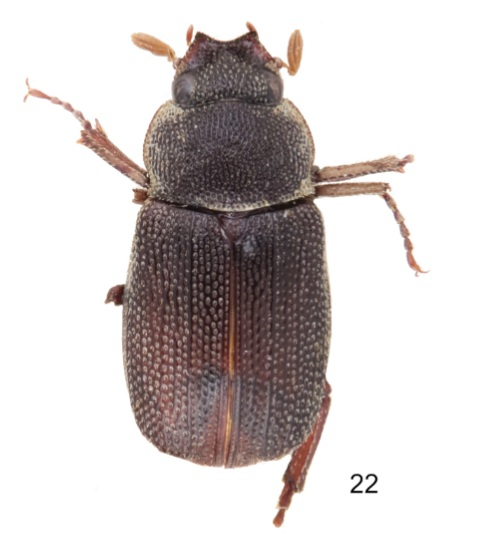

Scientific classification
- Kingdom: Animalia
- Phylum: Arthropoda
- Class: Insecta
- Order: Coleoptera
- Suborder: Polyphaga
- Infraorder: Scarabaeiformia
- Family: Scarabaeidae
- Genus: Maechidius
- Species: M. angusticeps

Binomial name
- Maechidius angusticeps Arrow, 1941

= Maechidius angusticeps =

Species of beetle

Maechidius angusticeps is a species of beetle of the family Scarabaeidae. It is found in Indonesia (Irian Jaya).

== Description ==
The dorsum and venter are uniformly black-brown, while the labroclypeus is castaneous brown.
