= Maechidius cakalele =

Scientific classification
- Kingdom: Animalia
- Phylum: Arthropoda
- Class: Insecta
- Order: Coleoptera
- Suborder: Polyphaga
- Infraorder: Scarabaeiformia
- Family: Scarabaeidae
- Genus: Maechidius
- Species: M. cakalele

Binomial name
- Maechidius cakalele (Narakusumo & Balke, 2019)

Synonyms
- Epholcis cakalele Narakusumo & Balke, 2019

Species of beetle

Maechidius cakalele is a species of beetle of the family Scarabaeidae. It is found in Indonesia (Moluccas), where they occur in disturbed forests and vegetation along streams at altitudes from 50 to 700 meters.

== Description ==
Adults reach a length of about 5.6–6.7 mm. They have a dark brown, shiny body, with ferruginous legs.

== Etymology ==
The species is named after Cakalele, a folk dance of people from north and central Malaku.
