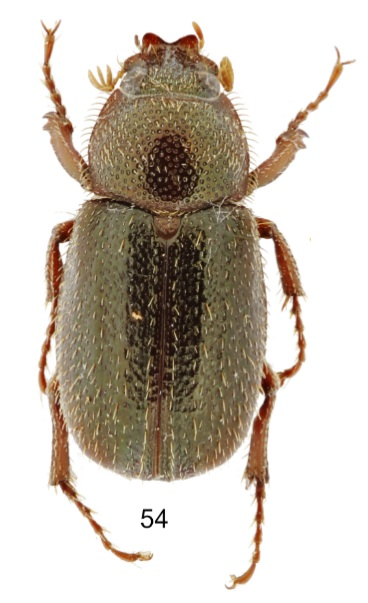

Scientific classification
- Kingdom: Animalia
- Phylum: Arthropoda
- Class: Insecta
- Order: Coleoptera
- Suborder: Polyphaga
- Infraorder: Scarabaeiformia
- Family: Scarabaeidae
- Genus: Maechidius
- Species: M. lobaticeps

Binomial name
- Maechidius lobaticeps Frey, 1969

= Maechidius lobaticeps =

Species of beetle

Maechidius lobaticeps is a species of beetle of the family Scarabaeidae. It is found in Papua New Guinea.
