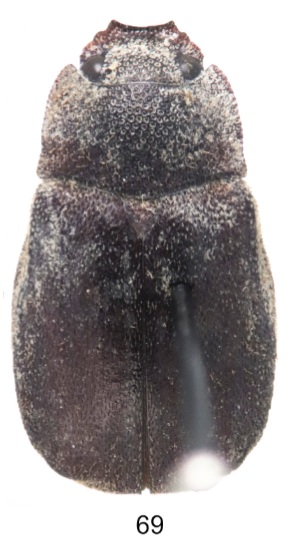

Scientific classification
- Kingdom: Animalia
- Phylum: Arthropoda
- Clade: Pancrustacea
- Class: Insecta
- Order: Coleoptera
- Suborder: Polyphaga
- Infraorder: Scarabaeiformia
- Family: Scarabaeidae
- Genus: Maechidius
- Species: M. parallelicollis

Binomial name
- Maechidius parallelicollis Moser, 1920

= Maechidius parallelicollis =

Species of beetle

Maechidius parallelicollis is a species of beetle of the family Scarabaeidae. It is found on Roon Island (Western New Guinea).

== Description ==
Adults reach a length of about 7.45 mm. The dorsum and venter are uniformly brown except for the paler appendages and antennae.
