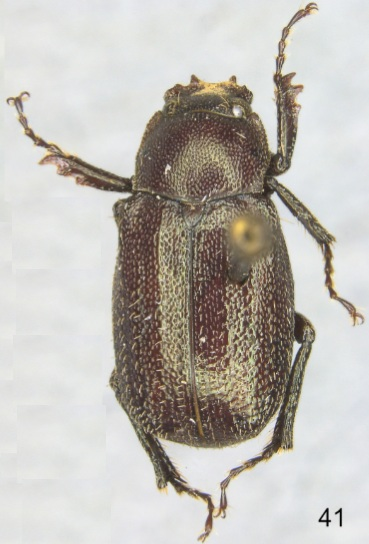

Scientific classification
- Kingdom: Animalia
- Phylum: Arthropoda
- Class: Insecta
- Order: Coleoptera
- Suborder: Polyphaga
- Infraorder: Scarabaeiformia
- Family: Scarabaeidae
- Genus: Maechidius
- Species: M. gressitti

Binomial name
- Maechidius gressitti Frey, 1969

= Maechidius gressitti =

Species of beetle

Maechidius gressitti is a species of beetle of the family Scarabaeidae. It is found in Papua New Guinea.

== Description ==
The male labroclypeus is deeply broadly emarginate anteriorly, its lateral margins strongly sinuous in both dorsal and lateral views.
