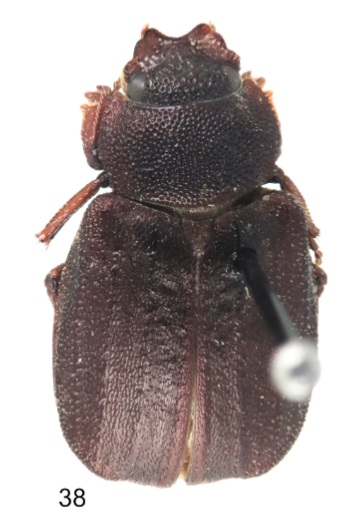

Scientific classification
- Kingdom: Animalia
- Phylum: Arthropoda
- Clade: Pancrustacea
- Class: Insecta
- Order: Coleoptera
- Suborder: Polyphaga
- Infraorder: Scarabaeiformia
- Family: Scarabaeidae
- Genus: Maechidius
- Species: M. fraterculus

Binomial name
- Maechidius fraterculus Moser, 1920

= Maechidius fraterculus =

Species of beetle

Maechidius fraterculus is a species of beetle of the family Scarabaeidae. It is found in Papua New Guinea.

== Description ==
Adults reach a length of about 9.10 mm. The dorsum and venter are uniformly castaneous brown except for the paler appendages and antennae.
