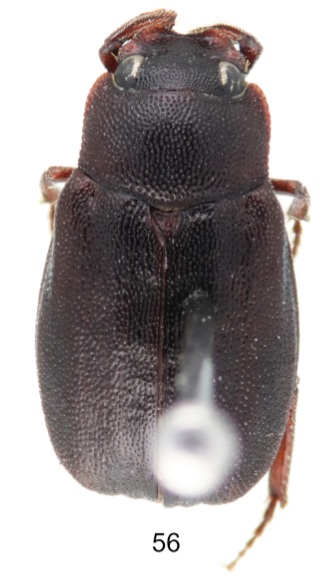

Scientific classification
- Kingdom: Animalia
- Phylum: Arthropoda
- Class: Insecta
- Order: Coleoptera
- Suborder: Polyphaga
- Infraorder: Scarabaeiformia
- Family: Scarabaeidae
- Genus: Maechidius
- Species: M. mailu

Binomial name
- Maechidius mailu Telnov, 2020

= Maechidius mailu =

Species of beetle

Maechidius mailu is a species of beetle of the family Scarabaeidae. It is found in Papua New Guinea.

== Description ==
Adults reach a length of about 8.20 mm. The dorsum and venter are uniformly brown, while the appendages and labroclypeus are castaneous.

== Etymology ==
The species is named after the Mailu, the local tribe and language of Amazon Bay, Papua New Guinea.
