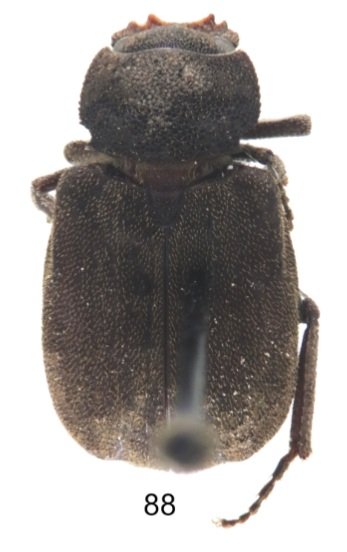

Scientific classification
- Kingdom: Animalia
- Phylum: Arthropoda
- Class: Insecta
- Order: Coleoptera
- Suborder: Polyphaga
- Infraorder: Scarabaeiformia
- Family: Scarabaeidae
- Genus: Maechidius
- Species: M. subcostatus

Binomial name
- Maechidius subcostatus Brenske, 1895

= Maechidius subcostatus =

Species of beetle

Maechidius subcostatus is a species of beetle of the family Scarabaeidae. It is found in Papua New Guinea.

== Description ==
Adults reach a length of about 7.70–9.70 mm. The dorsum is uniformly black-brown, while the venter and appendages are brown.
