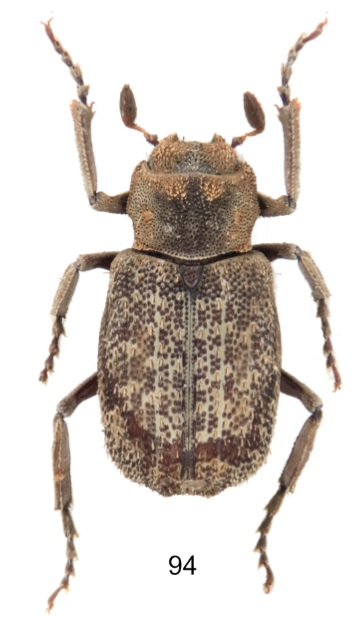

Scientific classification
- Kingdom: Animalia
- Phylum: Arthropoda
- Class: Insecta
- Order: Coleoptera
- Suborder: Polyphaga
- Infraorder: Scarabaeiformia
- Family: Scarabaeidae
- Genus: Maechidius
- Species: M. weigeli

Binomial name
- Maechidius weigeli Telnov, 2020

= Maechidius weigeli =

Species of beetle

Maechidius weigeli is a species of beetle of the family Scarabaeidae. It is found in Papua New Guinea and Indonesia (Irian Jaya), where it occurs in lower montane rainforests at about 1150 meters altitude.

== Description ==
Adults reach a length of about 5.80–6.60 mm. They have the general features of the pauxillus species group. The dorsal surface is opaque, except on the anterior margin of the labroclypeus.

== Etymology ==
The species is named after Andreas Weigel, a famous expert on old-world Cerambycidae.
