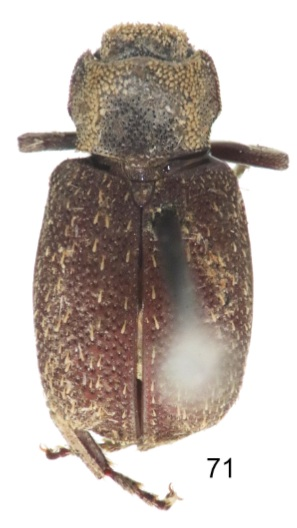

Scientific classification
- Kingdom: Animalia
- Phylum: Arthropoda
- Class: Insecta
- Order: Coleoptera
- Suborder: Polyphaga
- Infraorder: Scarabaeiformia
- Family: Scarabaeidae
- Genus: Maechidius
- Species: M. pauxillus

Binomial name
- Maechidius pauxillus Heller, 1910

Synonyms
- Paramaechidius pauxillus

= Maechidius pauxillus =

Species of beetle

Maechidius pauxillus is a species of beetle of the family Scarabaeidae. It is found in Papua New Guinea.

== Description ==
Adults reach a length of about 5.20–6.10 mm. The dorsum and venter are uniformly brown and the dorsum is almost completely covered with microscopical velvety pubescence.
