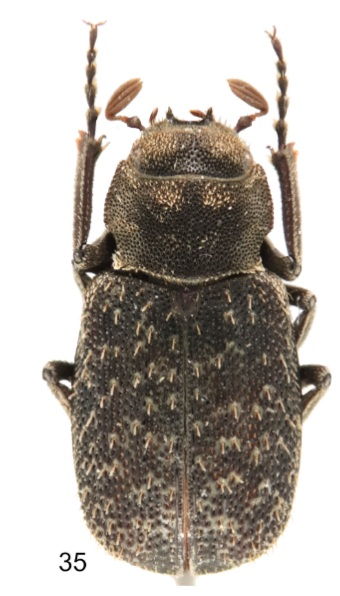

Scientific classification
- Kingdom: Animalia
- Phylum: Arthropoda
- Class: Insecta
- Order: Coleoptera
- Suborder: Polyphaga
- Infraorder: Scarabaeiformia
- Family: Scarabaeidae
- Genus: Maechidius
- Species: M. dendrolagus

Binomial name
- Maechidius dendrolagus Telnov, 2020

= Maechidius dendrolagus =

Species of beetle

Maechidius dendrolagus is a species of beetle of the family Scarabaeidae. It is found in Papua New Guinea, where it occurs in lowland rainforests at about 750 meters altitude.

== Description ==
Adults reach a length of about 8-8.45 mm. They have the general features of the pauxillus species-group. The dorsal surface is opaque except on the anterior and lateral margins of labroclypeus.

== Etymology ==
The species is named after Dendrolagus, an enigmatic genus of marsupial endemic to New Guinea, adjacent islands and Australian Queensland.
