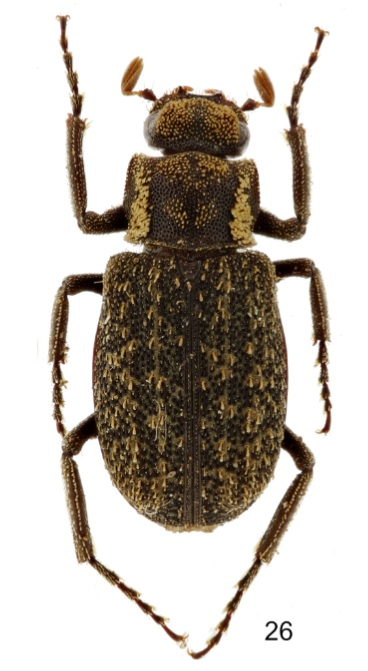

Scientific classification
- Kingdom: Animalia
- Phylum: Arthropoda
- Class: Insecta
- Order: Coleoptera
- Suborder: Polyphaga
- Infraorder: Scarabaeiformia
- Family: Scarabaeidae
- Genus: Maechidius
- Species: M. bintang

Binomial name
- Maechidius bintang Telnov, 2020

= Maechidius bintang =

Species of beetle

Maechidius bintang is a species of beetle of the family Scarabaeidae. It is found in Indonesia (Irian Jaya), where it occurs in primary lowland rainforests at altitudes of 250–359 meters.

== Description ==
Adults reach a length of about 7.95 mm. The dorsum is dark brown to black, the elytra with irregular slightly paler markings, especially along the carinae. The dorsal colouration is covered by numerous paler scale-like setae. The venter is uniformly dark brown.

== Etymology ==
The species name is derived from Penugungan Bintang, an Indonesian name for the Star Mountains, on the southern foothills of which this species was first collected.
