= Karl Borromaeus Maria Josef Heller =

Austrian entomologist (1864–1945)

Karl Borromaeus Maria Josef Heller (21 March 1864, Rappoltenkirchen – 25 December 1945, Dresden), was an Austrian entomologist who specialised in Coleoptera. He was a Professor and Section leader in the Staatliches Museum für Tierkunde Dresden where his collection is maintained. Heller was a taxonomist. He described many new species of world fauna. He was a Member of the Stettin Entomological Society.

== Publications ==
Partial list

- Heller, K.M. 1895. Erster Beitrag zur Papuanischen Kaeferfauna. Abhandlungen und Berichte des Königlichen Zoologischen und Anthropologische-Ethnographischen Museums zu Dresden 5 (16): 1–17
- Heller, K.M. 1898. Neue Käfer von Celebes. Abhandlungen und Berichte Konigl. Zoologischen und Anthropologisch-Ethnographischen Museums zu Dresden 7: 1-40, pl. 3.
- Heller, K.M. 1900. Systematische Aufzählung der Coleopteren mit Neubeschreibungen von Arten von E. Brenske und J. Faust. pp. 615–626 in Semon, R. (ed.). Zoologische Forschungsreisen in Australien und dem Malayischen Archipel. Jena : Gustav Fischer Vol. 5 778 pp.
- Heller, K.M. 1901. Dritter Beitrag zur Papuanischen Käferfauna. Abhandlungen und Berichte des Königlichen Zoologischen und Anthropologische-Ethnographischen Museums zu Dresden 10: 1–20
- Heller, K.M. 1908. Vierter Beitrag zur Papuanischen Käferfauna. Abhandlungen und Berichte des Königlichen Zoologischen und Anthropologisch-Ethnographischen Museums zu Dresden, 12 (1): 1–34 + 1 pl.
- Heller, K.M. 1915. Neue papuanische Rüsselkafer. Deutsche Entomologische Zeitschrift, 1915 (5): 513–528.
- Heller, K. M. 1916. Die Kafer von Neu-Caledonien und benachbarten Inselgruppen. Nova Caledonia Zool. 2: 229-364.
- Heller, K. M. 1923. Neue philippinische Kafer. Stettiner Entomologische Zeitung 84: 6-8.
