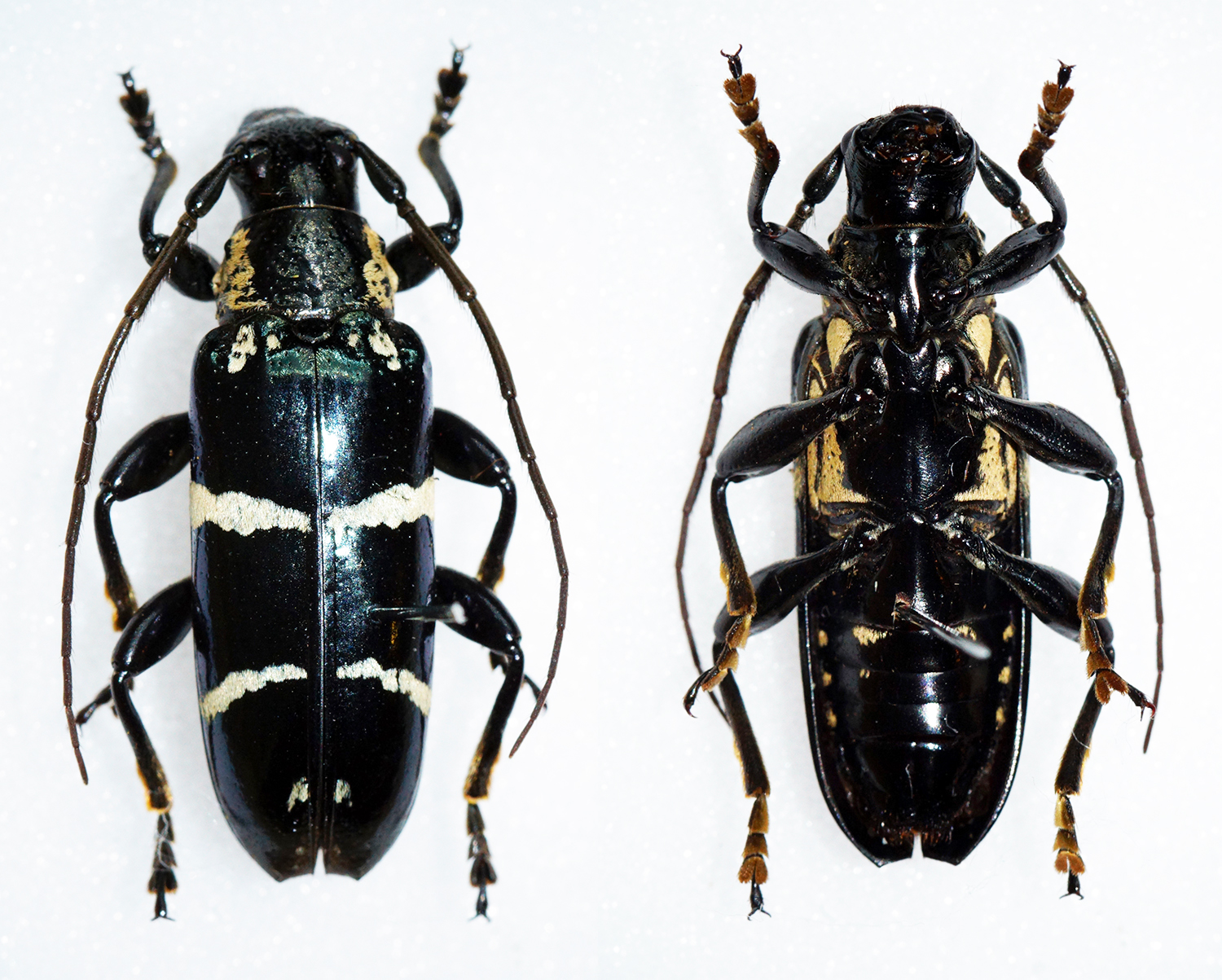
- Tmesisternus schaumi obscurus

Scientific classification
- Kingdom: Animalia
- Phylum: Arthropoda
- Class: Insecta
- Order: Coleoptera
- Suborder: Polyphaga
- Infraorder: Cucujiformia
- Family: Cerambycidae
- Genus: Tmesisternus
- Species: T. schaumii

Binomial name
- Tmesisternus schaumii Pascoe, 1867

Synonyms
- Tmesisternus schaumi Pascoe, 1867

= Tmesisternus schaumii =

Species of beetle

Tmesisternus schaumii is a species of beetle in the family Cerambycidae. It was described by Francis Polkinghorne Pascoe in 1867. It is known from Moluccas, Australia, and the Solomon Islands.

== Subspecies ==
- Tmesisternus schaumii schaumii Pascoe, 1867
- Tmesisternus schaumii leleti Gressitt, 1984
- Tmesisternus schaumii obscurus Heller, 1934
- Tmesisternus schaumii interruptus Heller, 1934
- Tmesisternus schaumii yorkensis (Fairmaire, 1881)
- Tmesisternus schaumii websteri Breuning, 1945
