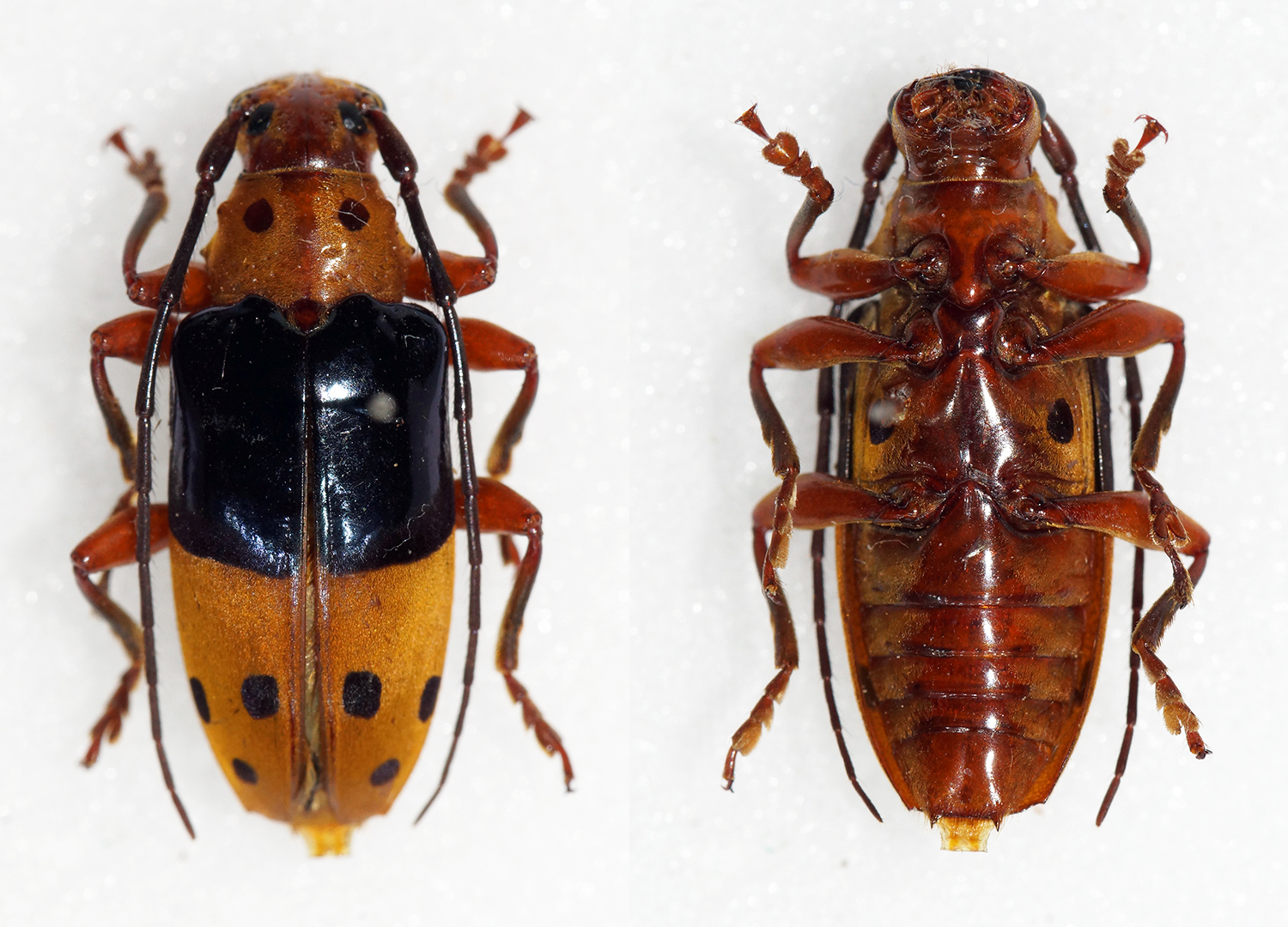

Scientific classification
- Domain: Eukaryota
- Kingdom: Animalia
- Phylum: Arthropoda
- Class: Insecta
- Order: Coleoptera
- Suborder: Polyphaga
- Infraorder: Cucujiformia
- Family: Cerambycidae
- Genus: Tmesisternus
- Species: T. speciosus

Binomial name
- Tmesisternus speciosus Pascoe, 1867

= Tmesisternus speciosus =

Species of beetle

Tmesisternus speciosus is a species of beetle in the family Cerambycidae. It was described by Francis Polkinghorne Pascoe in 1867.

== Subspecies ==
- Tmesisternus speciosus speciosus Pascoe, 1867
- Tmesisternus speciosus jobiensis Gestro, 1876
