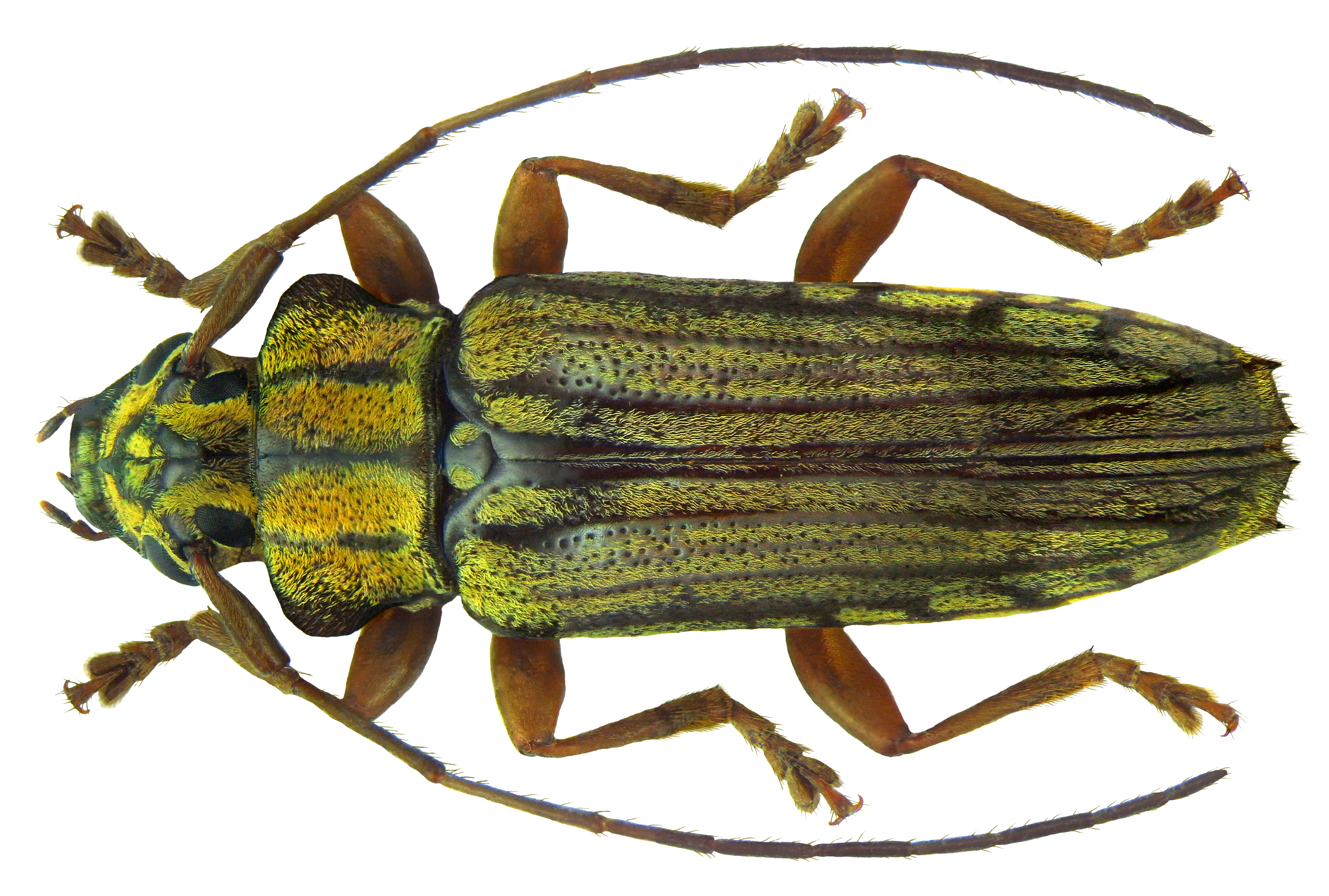

Scientific classification
- Domain: Eukaryota
- Kingdom: Animalia
- Phylum: Arthropoda
- Class: Insecta
- Order: Coleoptera
- Suborder: Polyphaga
- Infraorder: Cucujiformia
- Family: Cerambycidae
- Genus: Tmesisternus
- Species: T. rufipes

Binomial name
- Tmesisternus rufipes Blanchard, 1853

Synonyms
- Tmesisternus vittatus Breuning, 1956; Tmesisternus buruensis Breuning, 1950; Tmesisternus tenimberanus ? Breuning, 1973

= Tmesisternus rufipes =

Species of beetle

Tmesisternus rufipes is a species of beetle in the family Cerambycidae. It was described by Émile Blanchard in 1853.
