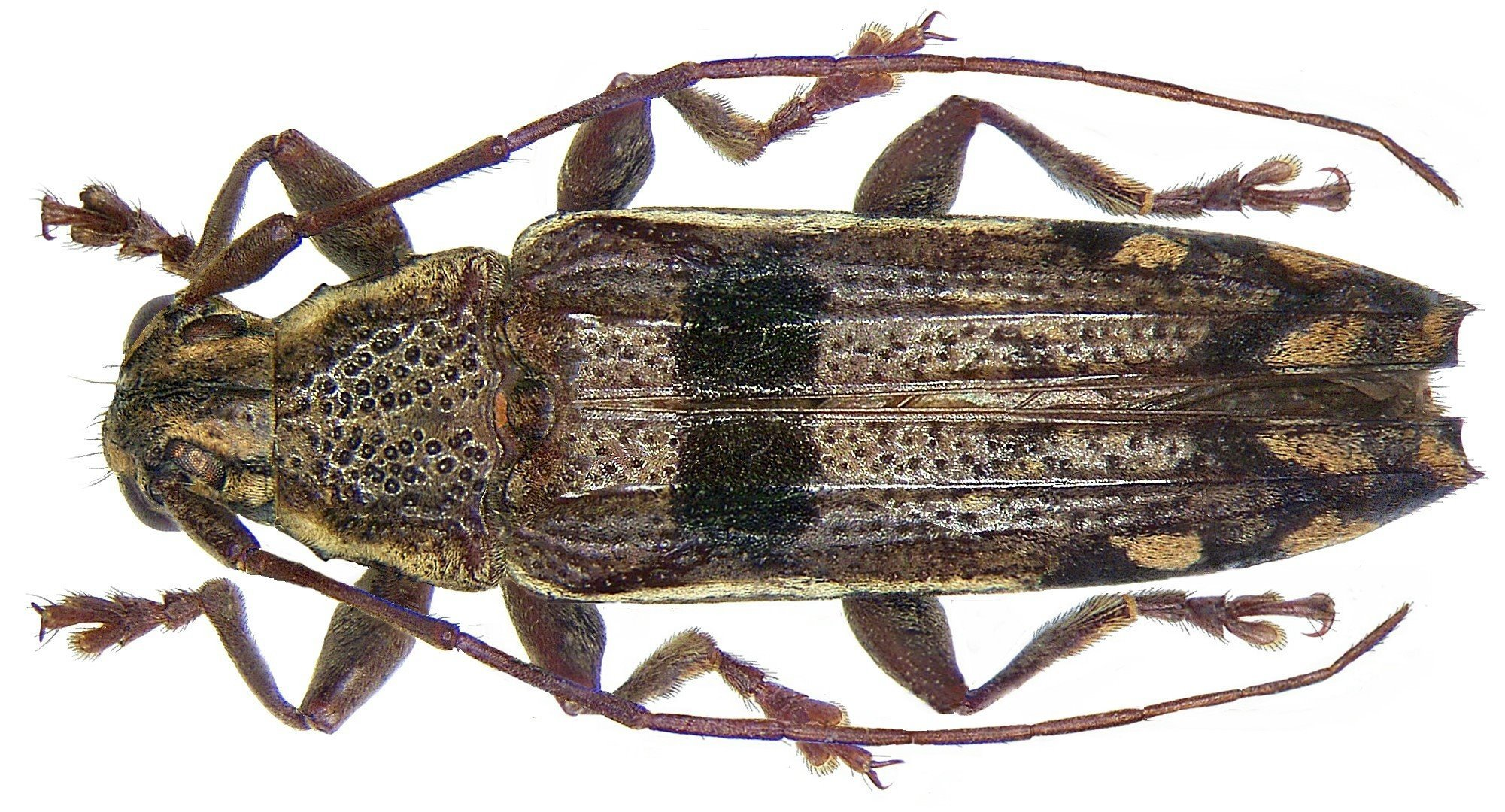

Scientific classification
- Domain: Eukaryota
- Kingdom: Animalia
- Phylum: Arthropoda
- Class: Insecta
- Order: Coleoptera
- Suborder: Polyphaga
- Infraorder: Cucujiformia
- Family: Cerambycidae
- Genus: Tmesisternus
- Species: T. nigrofasciatus

Binomial name
- Tmesisternus nigrofasciatus Aurivillius, 1908

= Tmesisternus nigrofasciatus =

Species of beetle

Tmesisternus nigrofasciatus is a species of beetle in the family Cerambycidae. It was described by Per Olof Christopher Aurivillius in 1908. It is known from Papua New Guinea.
