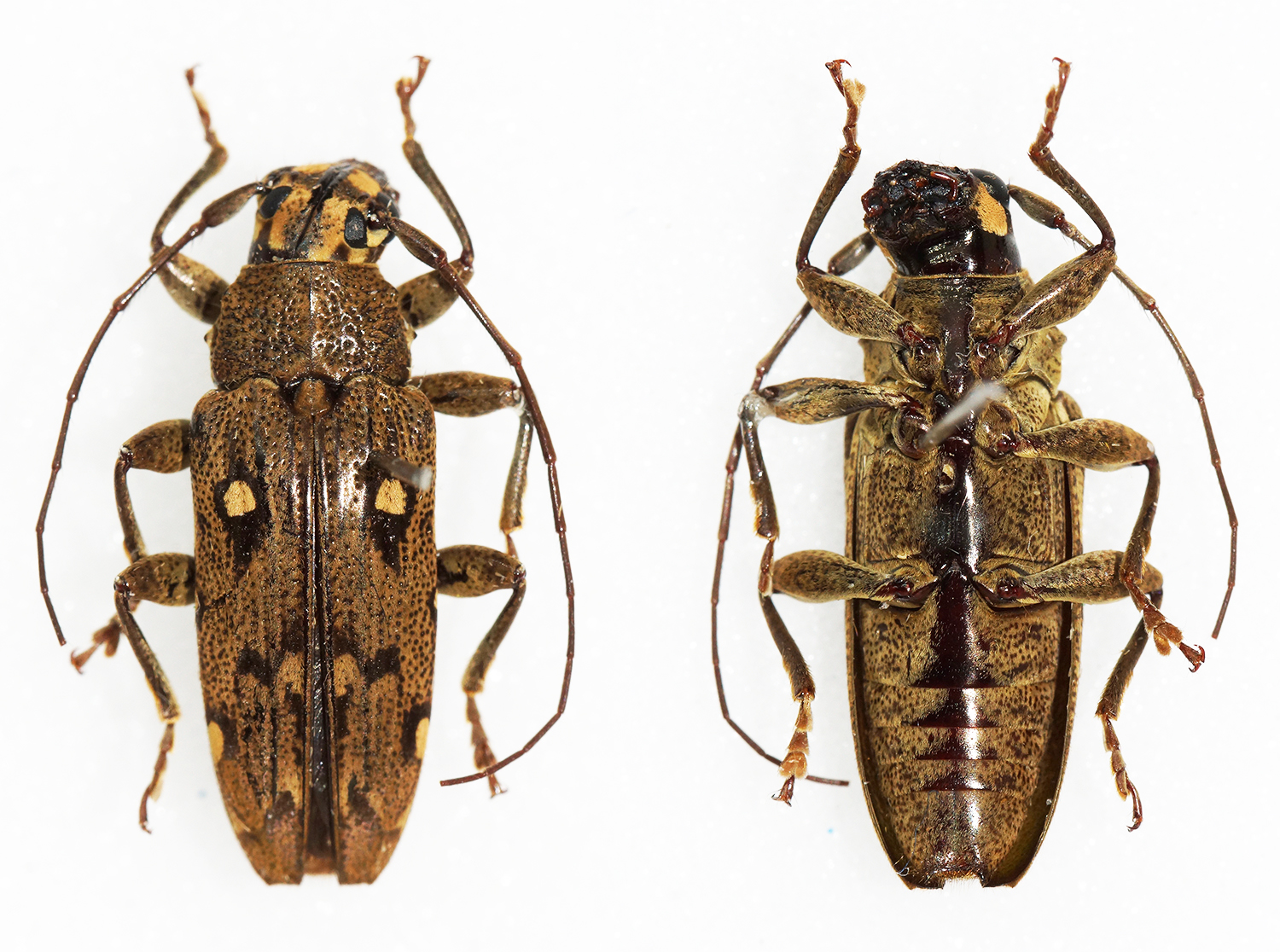

Scientific classification
- Kingdom: Animalia
- Phylum: Arthropoda
- Class: Insecta
- Order: Coleoptera
- Suborder: Polyphaga
- Infraorder: Cucujiformia
- Family: Cerambycidae
- Genus: Tmesisternus
- Species: T. sexmaculatus

Binomial name
- Tmesisternus sexmaculatus Breuning & De Jong, 1941

Synonyms
- Tmesisternus novemmaculatus Gilmour, 1949

= Tmesisternus sexmaculatus =

Species of beetle

Tmesisternus sexmaculatus is a species of beetle in the family Cerambycidae. It was described by Von Breuning and de Jong in 1941.
