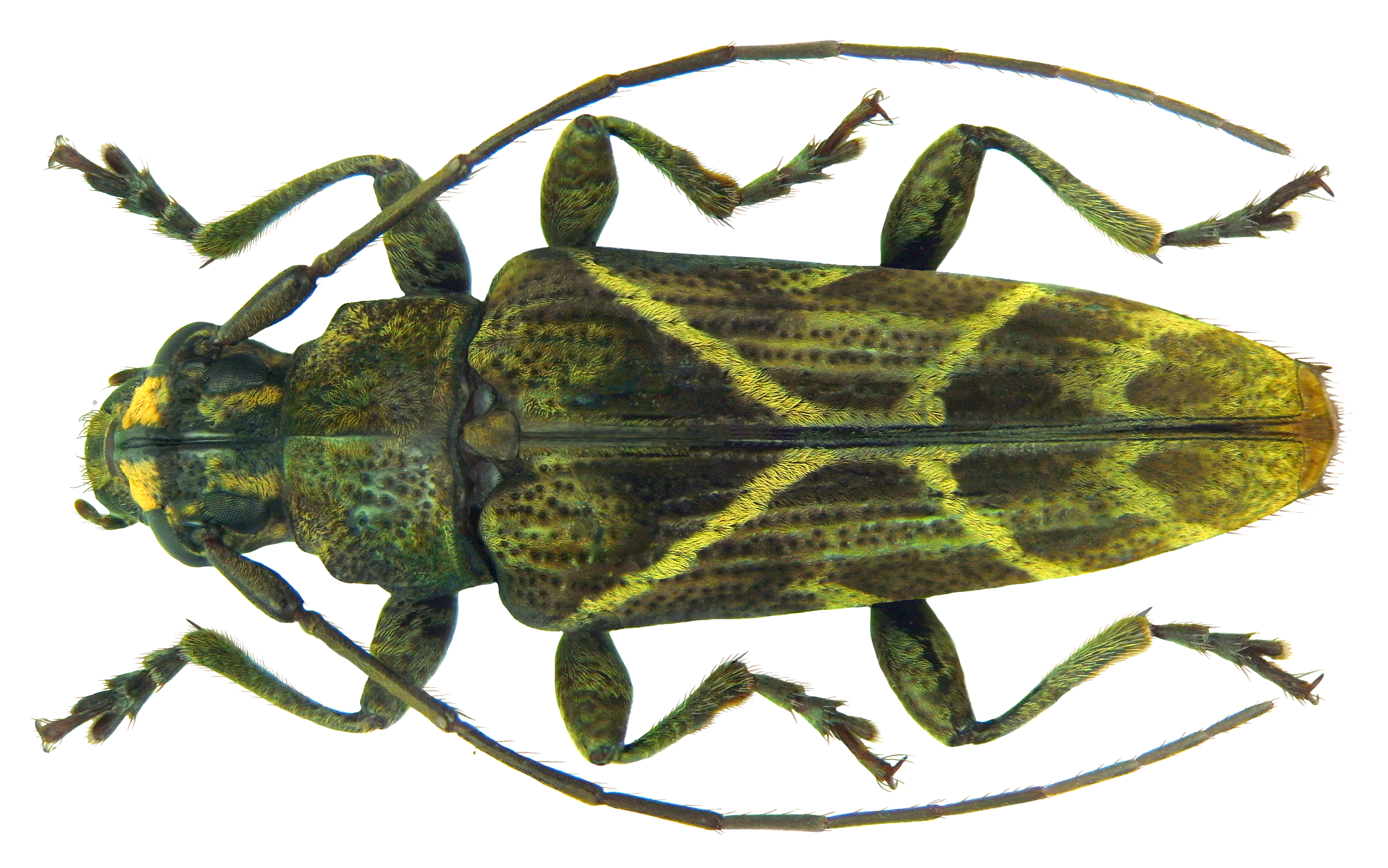

Scientific classification
- Kingdom: Animalia
- Phylum: Arthropoda
- Class: Insecta
- Order: Coleoptera
- Suborder: Polyphaga
- Infraorder: Cucujiformia
- Family: Cerambycidae
- Genus: Tmesisternus
- Species: T. biarcifer

Binomial name
- Tmesisternus biarcifer Blanchard, 1853

Synonyms
- Tmesisternus biarciferus Blanchard, 1853; Tmesisternus biarcifer Gahan, 1916

= Tmesisternus biarcifer =

Species of beetle

Tmesisternus biarcifer is a species of beetle in the family Cerambycidae. It was described by Blanchard in 1853.
