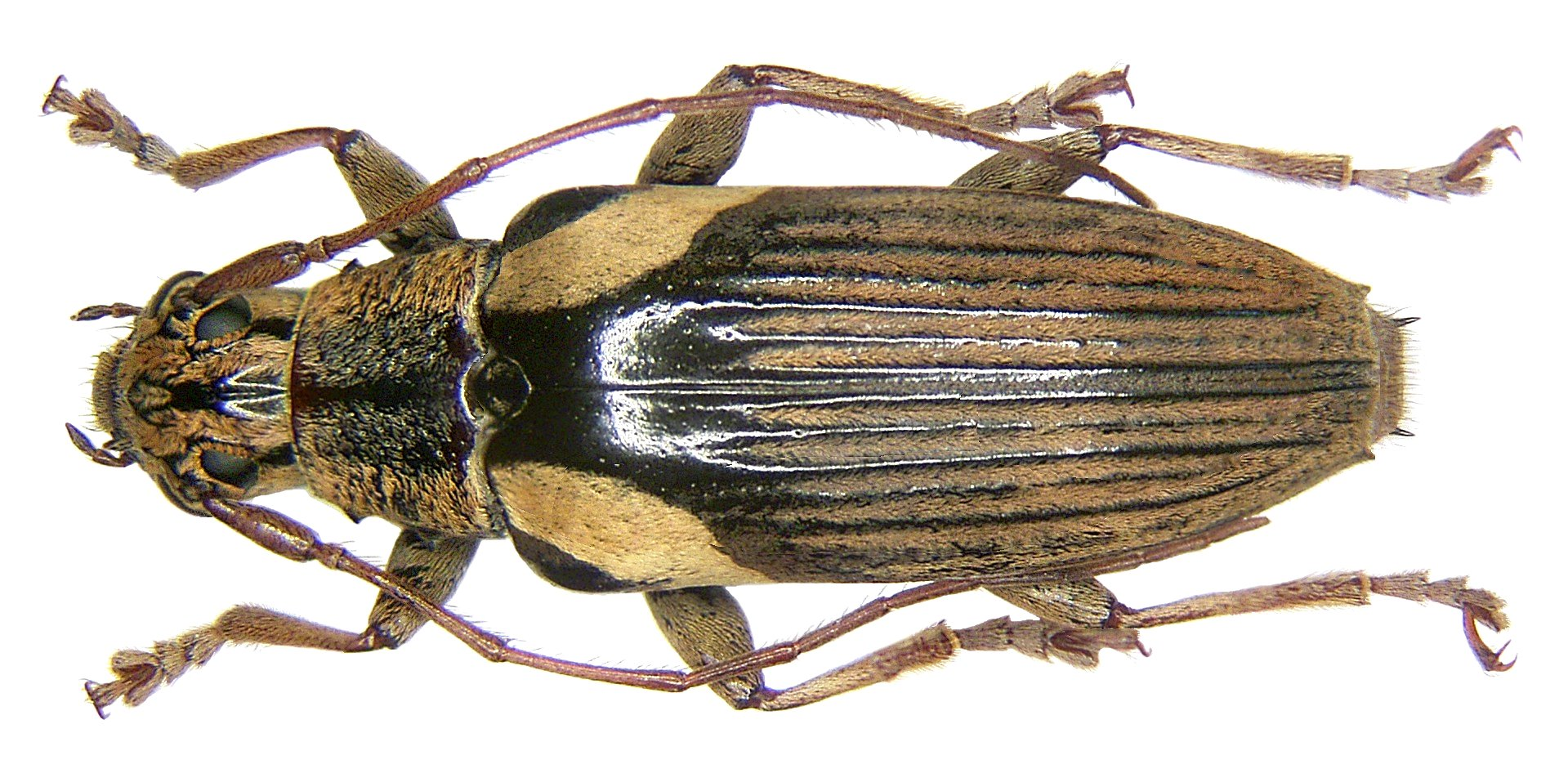

Scientific classification
- Domain: Eukaryota
- Kingdom: Animalia
- Phylum: Arthropoda
- Class: Insecta
- Order: Coleoptera
- Suborder: Polyphaga
- Infraorder: Cucujiformia
- Family: Cerambycidae
- Genus: Tmesisternus
- Species: T. humeralis

Binomial name
- Tmesisternus humeralis Aurivillius, 1923

= Tmesisternus humeralis =

Species of beetle

Tmesisternus humeralis is a species of beetle in the family Cerambycidae. It was described by Per Olof Christopher Aurivillius in 1923. It is known from Papua New Guinea.
