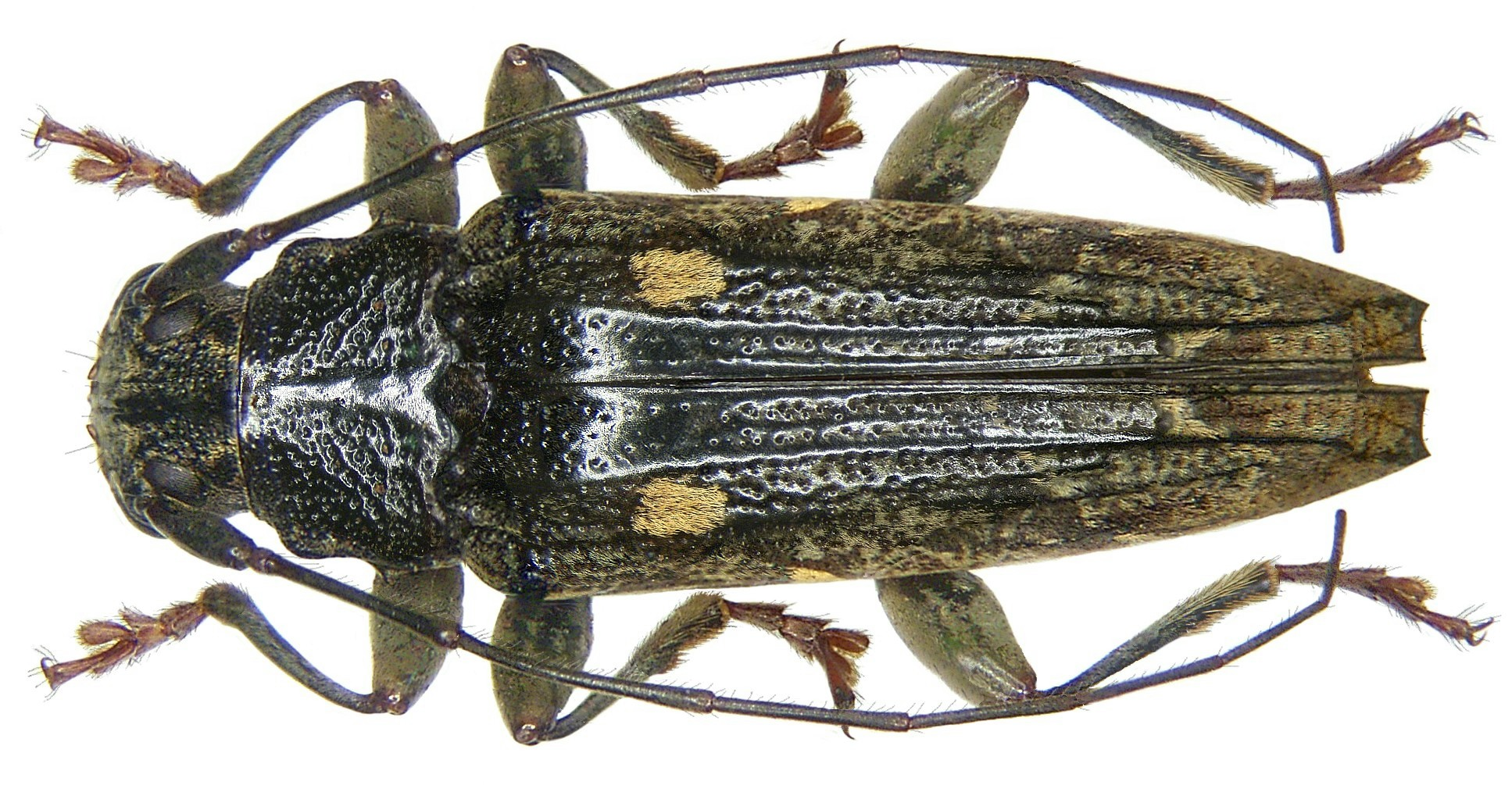

Scientific classification
- Kingdom: Animalia
- Phylum: Arthropoda
- Clade: Pancrustacea
- Class: Insecta
- Order: Coleoptera
- Suborder: Polyphaga
- Infraorder: Cucujiformia
- Family: Cerambycidae
- Genus: Tmesisternus
- Species: T. discomaculatus

Binomial name
- Tmesisternus discomaculatus Breuning, 1939

= Tmesisternus discomaculatus =

Species of beetle

Tmesisternus discomaculatus is a species of beetle in the family Cerambycidae. It was described by Stephan von Breuning in 1939.
