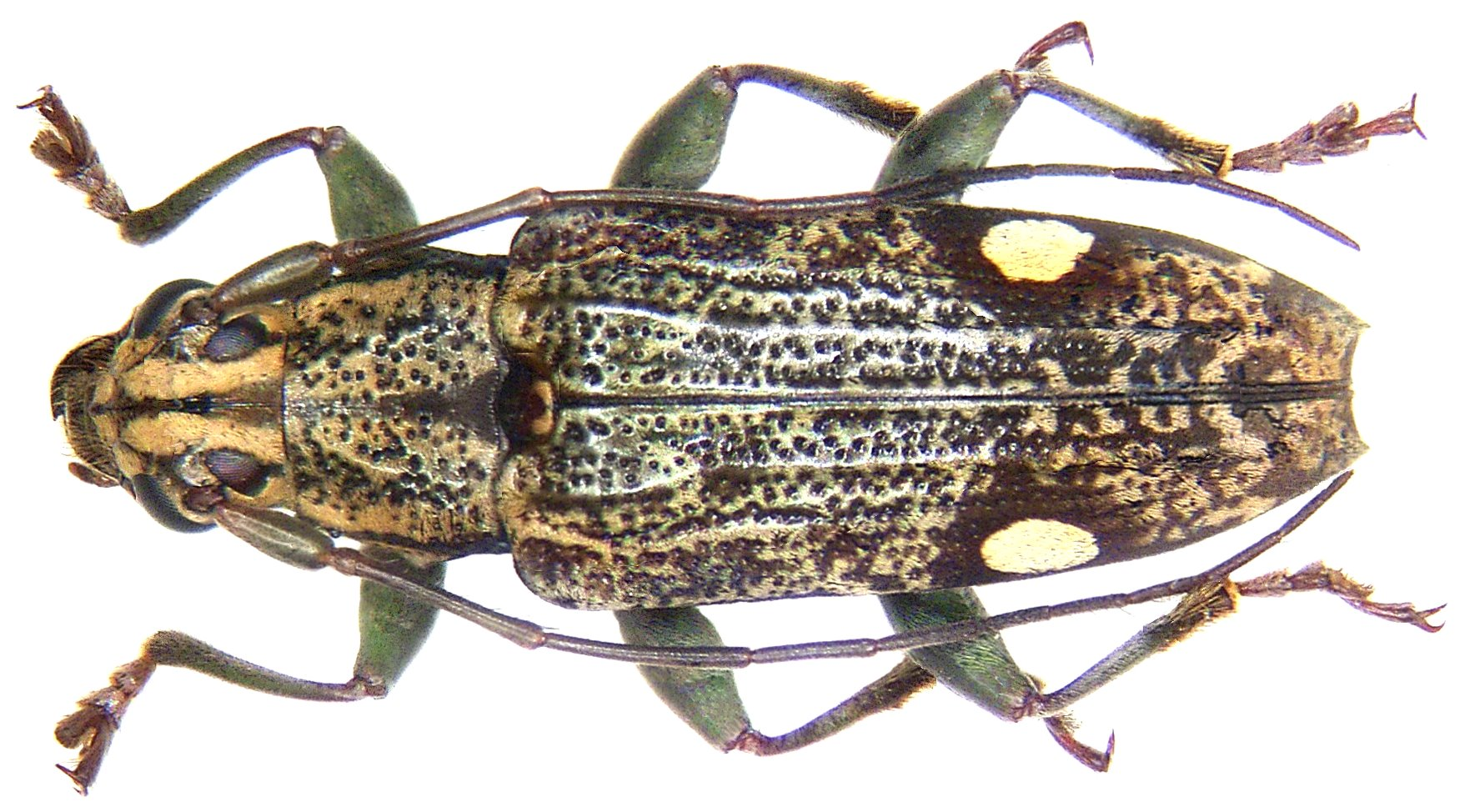

Scientific classification
- Domain: Eukaryota
- Kingdom: Animalia
- Phylum: Arthropoda
- Class: Insecta
- Order: Coleoptera
- Suborder: Polyphaga
- Infraorder: Cucujiformia
- Family: Cerambycidae
- Genus: Tmesisternus
- Species: T. herbaceus

Binomial name
- Tmesisternus herbaceus Pascoe, 1862

= Tmesisternus herbaceus =

Species of beetle

Tmesisternus herbaceus is a species of beetle in the family Cerambycidae. It was described by Francis Polkinghorne Pascoe in 1862. It is known from Papua New Guinea.
