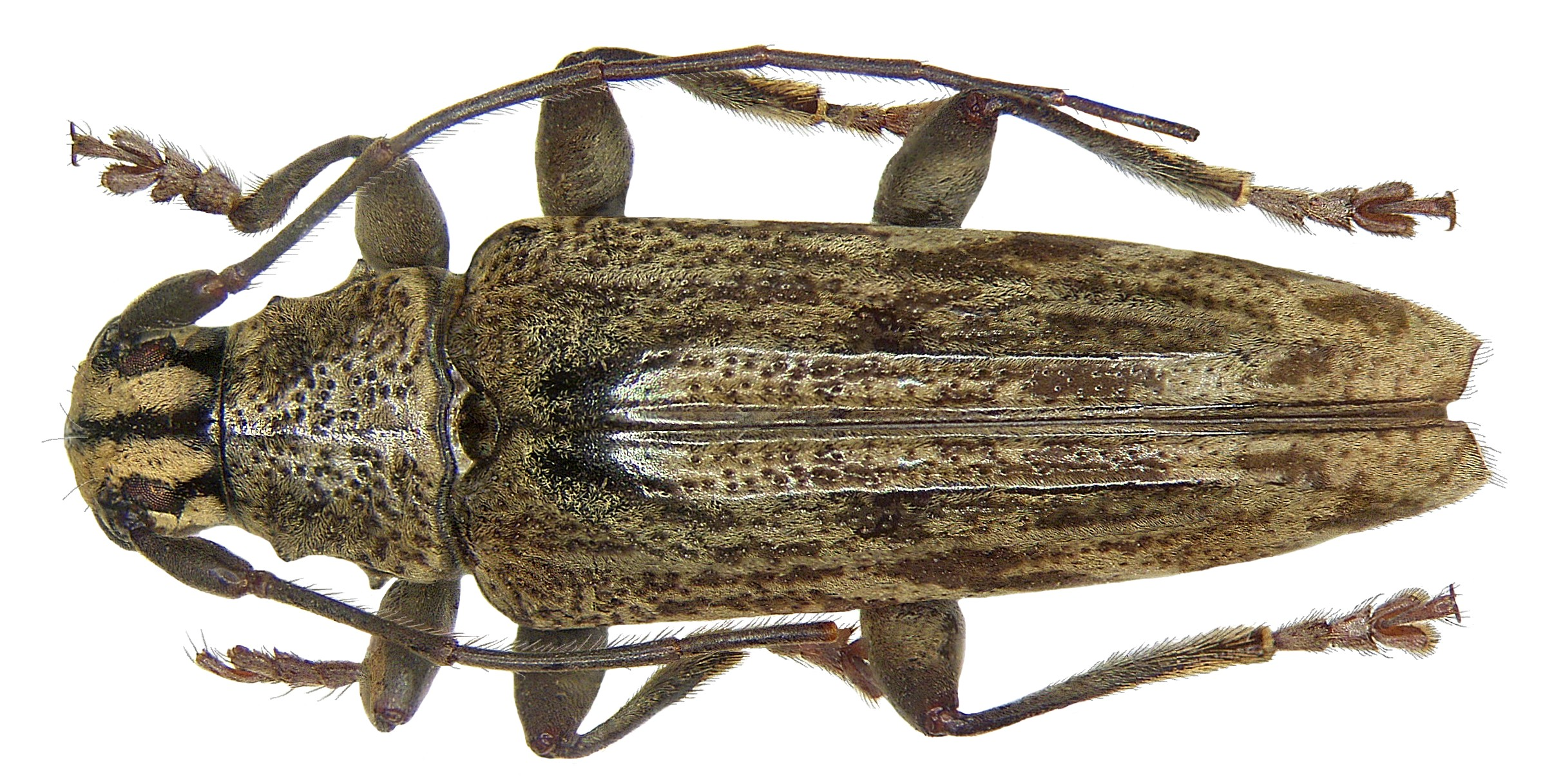

Scientific classification
- Kingdom: Animalia
- Phylum: Arthropoda
- Class: Insecta
- Order: Coleoptera
- Suborder: Polyphaga
- Infraorder: Cucujiformia
- Family: Cerambycidae
- Genus: Tmesisternus
- Species: T. obsoletus

Binomial name
- Tmesisternus obsoletus Blanchard, 1855

= Tmesisternus obsoletus =

Species of beetle

Tmesisternus obsoletus is a species of beetle in the family Cerambycidae. It was described by Blanchard in 1855.
