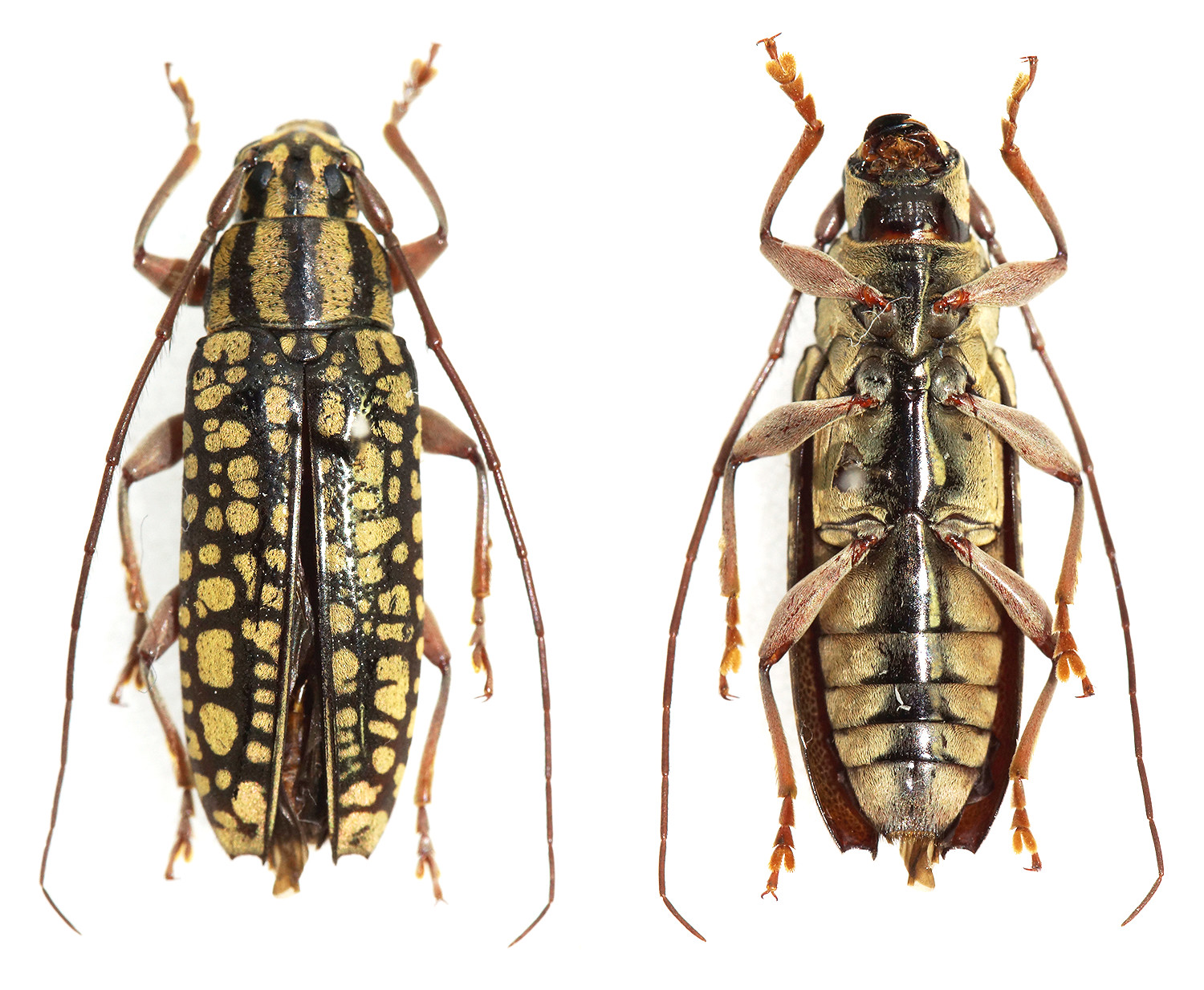

Scientific classification
- Kingdom: Animalia
- Phylum: Arthropoda
- Class: Insecta
- Order: Coleoptera
- Suborder: Polyphaga
- Infraorder: Cucujiformia
- Family: Cerambycidae
- Genus: Tmesisternus
- Species: T. fulgens

Binomial name
- Tmesisternus fulgens Breuning, 1939

= Tmesisternus fulgens =

Species of beetle

Tmesisternus fulgens is a species of beetle in the family Cerambycidae. It was described by Stephan von Breuning in 1939. It reaches a size of approximately 15.5 mm.
