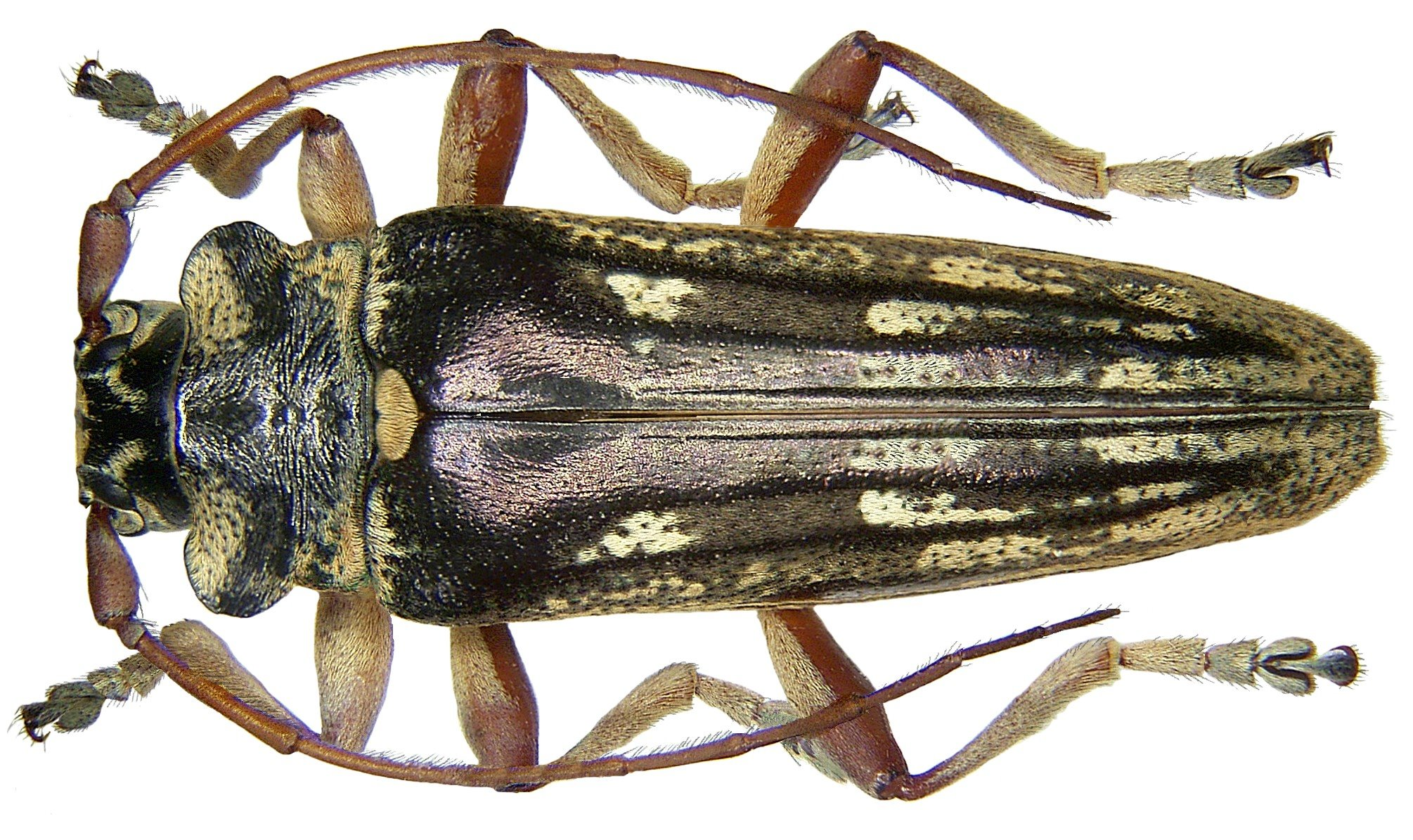

Scientific classification
- Domain: Eukaryota
- Kingdom: Animalia
- Phylum: Arthropoda
- Class: Insecta
- Order: Coleoptera
- Suborder: Polyphaga
- Infraorder: Cucujiformia
- Family: Cerambycidae
- Genus: Tmesisternus
- Species: T. pauli

Binomial name
- Tmesisternus pauli (Heller, 1897)

Synonyms
- Tmesisternopsis pauli (Heller, 1897)

= Tmesisternus pauli =

Species of beetle

Tmesisternus pauli is a species of beetle in the family Cerambycidae.
