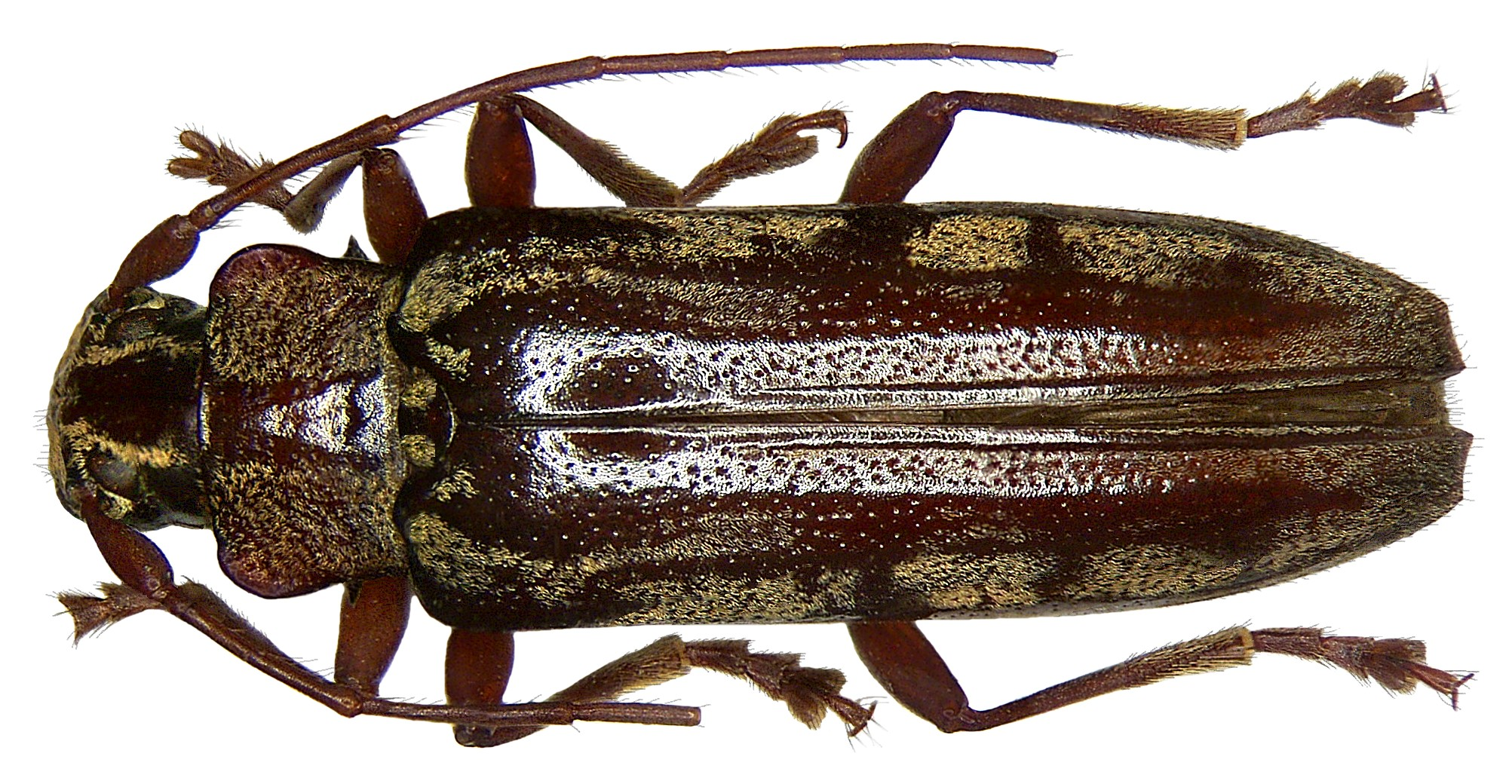

Scientific classification
- Kingdom: Animalia
- Phylum: Arthropoda
- Class: Insecta
- Order: Coleoptera
- Suborder: Polyphaga
- Infraorder: Cucujiformia
- Family: Cerambycidae
- Genus: Tmesisternus
- Species: T. florensis

Binomial name
- Tmesisternus florensis Breuning, 1948

= Tmesisternus florensis =

Species of beetle

Tmesisternus florensis is a species of beetle in the family Cerambycidae. It was described by Stephan von Breuning in 1948.
