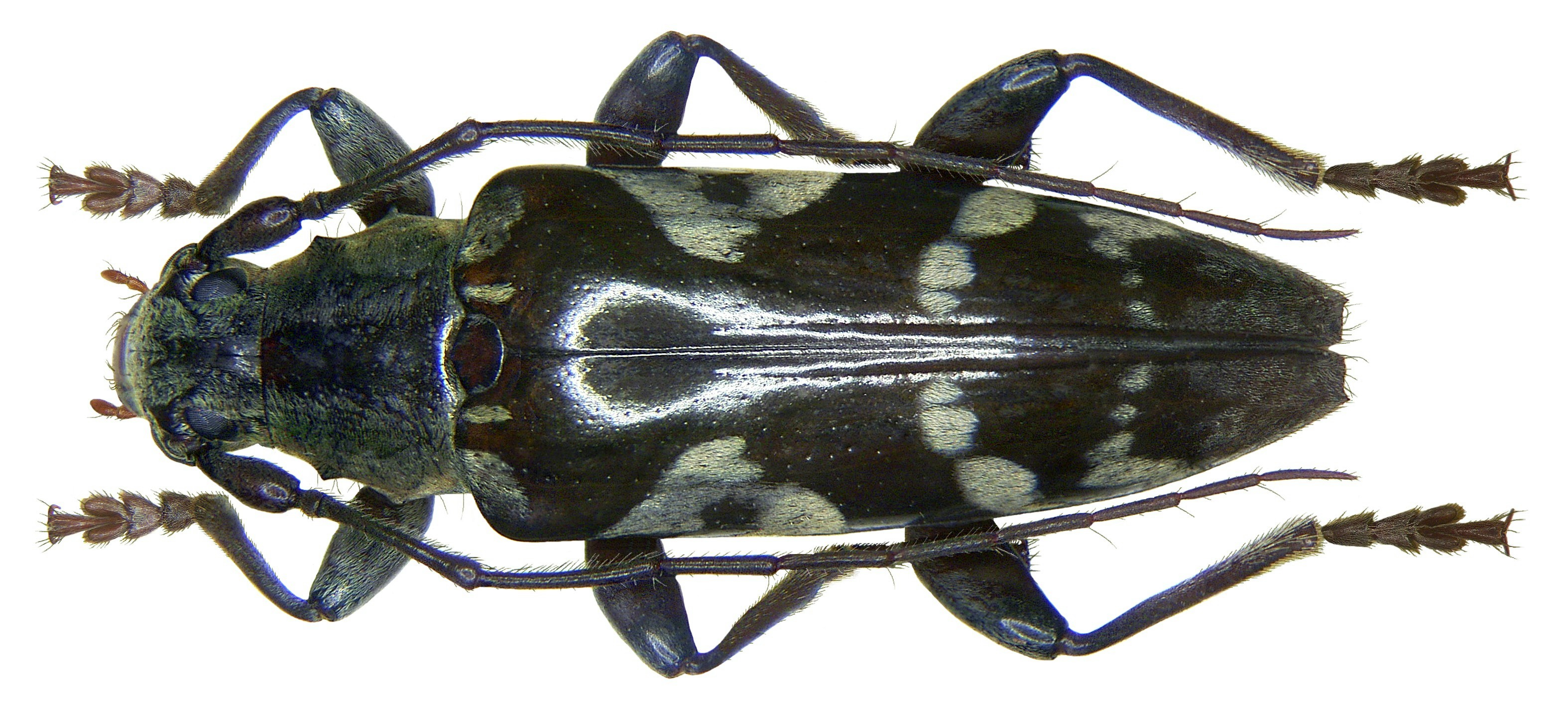

Scientific classification
- Domain: Eukaryota
- Kingdom: Animalia
- Phylum: Arthropoda
- Class: Insecta
- Order: Coleoptera
- Suborder: Polyphaga
- Infraorder: Cucujiformia
- Family: Cerambycidae
- Genus: Tmesisternus
- Species: T. wiedenfeldi

Binomial name
- Tmesisternus wiedenfeldi (Aurivillius, 1911)

= Tmesisternus wiedenfeldi =

Species of beetle

Tmesisternus wiedenfeldi is a species of beetle from the family Cerambycidae. The scientific name of this species was first published in 1911 by Per Olof Christopher Aurivillius.
