= Tmesisternus postfasciatus =

Scientific classification
- Kingdom: Animalia
- Phylum: Arthropoda
- Class: Insecta
- Order: Coleoptera
- Suborder: Polyphaga
- Infraorder: Cucujiformia
- Family: Cerambycidae
- Genus: Tmesisternus
- Species: T. postfasciatus

Binomial name
- Tmesisternus postfasciatus Breuning & De Jong, 1941

Species of beetle

Tmesisternus postfasciatus is a species of beetle in the family Cerambycidae. It was described by Von Breuning and De Jong in 1941. It is known from Papua New Guinea.

== Subspecies ==
- Tmesisternus postfasciatus postmaculatus Breuning & De Jong, 1941
- Tmesisternus postfasciatus postfasciatus Breuning & De Jong, 1941
