= Tmesisternus unipunctatus =

Scientific classification
- Kingdom: Animalia
- Phylum: Arthropoda
- Clade: Pancrustacea
- Class: Insecta
- Order: Coleoptera
- Suborder: Polyphaga
- Infraorder: Cucujiformia
- Family: Cerambycidae
- Genus: Tmesisternus
- Species: T. unipunctatus

Binomial name
- Tmesisternus unipunctatus Guérin-Méneville, 1835

Synonyms
- Tmesisternus interruptevittatus Breuning, 1975; Tmesisternus densepunctatus Breuning, 1939

Species of beetle

Tmesisternus unipunctatus is a species of beetle in the family Cerambycidae. It was described by Félix Édouard Guérin-Méneville in 1835.
