= Tmesisternus excellens =

Scientific classification
- Domain: Eukaryota
- Kingdom: Animalia
- Phylum: Arthropoda
- Class: Insecta
- Order: Coleoptera
- Suborder: Polyphaga
- Infraorder: Cucujiformia
- Family: Cerambycidae
- Genus: Tmesisternus
- Species: T. excellens

Binomial name
- Tmesisternus excellens Aurivillius, 1908

Species of beetle

Tmesisternus excellens is a species of beetle in the family Cerambycidae. It was described by Per Olof Christopher Aurivillius. It is known from Papua New Guinea.

== Subspecies ==
- Tmesisternus excellens excellens Aurivillius, 1908
- Tmesisternus excellens albosignatus Gahan, 1916
