= Tmesisternus agriloides =

Scientific classification
- Domain: Eukaryota
- Kingdom: Animalia
- Phylum: Arthropoda
- Class: Insecta
- Order: Coleoptera
- Suborder: Polyphaga
- Infraorder: Cucujiformia
- Family: Cerambycidae
- Genus: Tmesisternus
- Species: T. agriloides

Binomial name
- Tmesisternus agriloides Pascoe, 1867

Species of beetle

Tmesisternus agriloides is a species of beetle in the family Cerambycidae. It was described by Francis Polkinghorne Pascoe in 1867.

== Subspecies ==
- Tmesisternus agriloides persimilis Breuning, 1968
- Tmesisternus agriloides agriloides Pascoe, 1867
