= Tmesisternus gabrieli =

Scientific classification
- Domain: Eukaryota
- Kingdom: Animalia
- Phylum: Arthropoda
- Class: Insecta
- Order: Coleoptera
- Suborder: Polyphaga
- Infraorder: Cucujiformia
- Family: Cerambycidae
- Genus: Tmesisternus
- Species: T. gabrieli

Binomial name
- Tmesisternus gabrieli Schwarzer, 1931

Synonyms
- Tmesisternus gabrielae (Schwarzer) Breuning, 1945

Species of beetle

Tmesisternus gabrieli is a species of beetle in the family Cerambycidae. It was described by Bernhard Schwarzer in 1931. It is known from Papua New Guinea.
