= Tmesisternus bizonulatus =

Scientific classification
- Kingdom: Animalia
- Phylum: Arthropoda
- Clade: Pancrustacea
- Class: Insecta
- Order: Coleoptera
- Suborder: Polyphaga
- Infraorder: Cucujiformia
- Family: Cerambycidae
- Genus: Tmesisternus
- Species: T. bizonulatus

Binomial name
- Tmesisternus bizonulatus Guerin-Meneville, 1831

Species of beetle

Tmesisternus bizonulatus is a species of beetle in the family Cerambycidae. It was described by Félix Édouard Guérin-Méneville in 1831.
