= Tmesisternus breuningi =

Scientific classification
- Domain: Eukaryota
- Kingdom: Animalia
- Phylum: Arthropoda
- Class: Insecta
- Order: Coleoptera
- Suborder: Polyphaga
- Infraorder: Cucujiformia
- Family: Cerambycidae
- Genus: Tmesisternus
- Species: T. breuningi

Binomial name
- Tmesisternus breuningi Gilmour, 1950

Species of beetle

Tmesisternus breuningi is a species of beetle in the family Cerambycidae. It was described by E. Forrest Gilmour in 1950. It is known from Papua New Guinea.
