= Tmesisternus hoyoisi =

Scientific classification
- Domain: Eukaryota
- Kingdom: Animalia
- Phylum: Arthropoda
- Class: Insecta
- Order: Coleoptera
- Suborder: Polyphaga
- Infraorder: Cucujiformia
- Family: Cerambycidae
- Genus: Tmesisternus
- Species: T. hoyoisi

Binomial name
- Tmesisternus hoyoisi Weigel, 2006

Species of beetle

Tmesisternus hoyoisi is a species of beetle in the family Cerambycidae. It was described by Weigel in 2006. It is known from Papua New Guinea.
