= Tmesisternus obtusatus =

Scientific classification
- Domain: Eukaryota
- Kingdom: Animalia
- Phylum: Arthropoda
- Class: Insecta
- Order: Coleoptera
- Suborder: Polyphaga
- Infraorder: Cucujiformia
- Family: Cerambycidae
- Genus: Tmesisternus
- Species: T. obtusatus

Binomial name
- Tmesisternus obtusatus Gressitt, 1984

Species of beetle

Tmesisternus obtusatus is a species of beetle in the family Cerambycidae. It was described by Gressitt in 1984. It is known from Papua New Guinea.
