= Tmesisternus rotundipennis =

Scientific classification
- Kingdom: Animalia
- Phylum: Arthropoda
- Class: Insecta
- Order: Coleoptera
- Suborder: Polyphaga
- Infraorder: Cucujiformia
- Family: Cerambycidae
- Genus: Tmesisternus
- Species: T. rotundipennis

Binomial name
- Tmesisternus rotundipennis Breuning, 1948

Species of beetle

Tmesisternus rotundipennis is a species of beetle in the family Cerambycidae. It was described by Stephan von Breuning in 1948. It is known from Papua New Guinea.
