= Tmesisternus viridipennis =

Scientific classification
- Kingdom: Animalia
- Phylum: Arthropoda
- Class: Insecta
- Order: Coleoptera
- Suborder: Polyphaga
- Infraorder: Cucujiformia
- Family: Cerambycidae
- Genus: Tmesisternus
- Species: T. viridipennis

Binomial name
- Tmesisternus viridipennis Breuning, 1940

Species of beetle

Tmesisternus viridipennis is a species of beetle in the family Cerambycidae. It was described by Stephan von Breuning in 1940.
