= Tmesisternus costiceps =

Scientific classification
- Kingdom: Animalia
- Phylum: Arthropoda
- Class: Insecta
- Order: Coleoptera
- Suborder: Polyphaga
- Infraorder: Cucujiformia
- Family: Cerambycidae
- Genus: Tmesisternus
- Species: T. costiceps

Binomial name
- Tmesisternus costiceps Breuning, 1968

Species of beetle

Tmesisternus costiceps is a species of beetle in the family Cerambycidae, described by Stephan von Breuning in 1968.
