= Tmesisternus salomonus =

Scientific classification
- Domain: Eukaryota
- Kingdom: Animalia
- Phylum: Arthropoda
- Class: Insecta
- Order: Coleoptera
- Suborder: Polyphaga
- Infraorder: Cucujiformia
- Family: Cerambycidae
- Genus: Tmesisternus
- Species: T. salomonus

Binomial name
- Tmesisternus salomonus (Aurivillius, 1920)

Species of beetle

Tmesisternus salomonus is a species of beetle in the family Cerambycidae.
