= Tmesisternus lansbergei =

Scientific classification
- Kingdom: Animalia
- Phylum: Arthropoda
- Class: Insecta
- Order: Coleoptera
- Suborder: Polyphaga
- Infraorder: Cucujiformia
- Family: Cerambycidae
- Genus: Tmesisternus
- Species: T. lansbergei

Binomial name
- Tmesisternus lansbergei Breuning, 1945

Species of beetle

Tmesisternus lansbergei is a species of beetle in the family Cerambycidae.
