= Eunidia haplotrita =

Scientific classification
- Kingdom: Animalia
- Phylum: Arthropoda
- Clade: Pancrustacea
- Class: Insecta
- Order: Coleoptera
- Suborder: Polyphaga
- Infraorder: Cucujiformia
- Family: Cerambycidae
- Genus: Eunidia
- Species: E. haplotrita

Binomial name
- Eunidia haplotrita Aurivillius, 1911

Species of beetle

Eunidia haplotrita is a species of beetle in the family Cerambycidae. It was described by Per Olof Christopher Aurivillius in 1911.

== Subspecies ==
- Eunidia haplotrita var. albomarmorata Breuning, 1943
- Eunidia haplotrita var. densemarmorata Breuning, 1963
