= Eunidia albolineata =

Scientific classification
- Kingdom: Animalia
- Phylum: Arthropoda
- Clade: Pancrustacea
- Class: Insecta
- Order: Coleoptera
- Suborder: Polyphaga
- Infraorder: Cucujiformia
- Family: Cerambycidae
- Genus: Eunidia
- Species: E. albolineata

Binomial name
- Eunidia albolineata Breuning, 1959

Species of beetle

Eunidia albolineata is a species of beetle in the family Cerambycidae. It was described by Stephan von Breuning in 1959.
