= Eunidia quadrialbosignata =

Scientific classification
- Kingdom: Animalia
- Phylum: Arthropoda
- Clade: Pancrustacea
- Class: Insecta
- Order: Coleoptera
- Suborder: Polyphaga
- Infraorder: Cucujiformia
- Family: Cerambycidae
- Genus: Eunidia
- Species: E. quadrialbosignata

Binomial name
- Eunidia quadrialbosignata Breuning, 1965

Species of beetle

Eunidia quadrialbosignata is a species of beetle in the family Cerambycidae. It was described by Stephan von Breuning in 1965. It is known from the Democratic Republic of the Congo.
