= Eunidia joveri =

Scientific classification
- Kingdom: Animalia
- Phylum: Arthropoda
- Clade: Pancrustacea
- Class: Insecta
- Order: Coleoptera
- Suborder: Polyphaga
- Infraorder: Cucujiformia
- Family: Cerambycidae
- Genus: Eunidia
- Species: E. joveri

Binomial name
- Eunidia joveri Lepesme & Breuning, 1953

Species of beetle

Eunidia joveri is a species of beetle in the family Cerambycidae. It was described by Lepesme and Stephan von Breuning in 1953.
