= Eunidia griseitarsis =

Scientific classification
- Kingdom: Animalia
- Phylum: Arthropoda
- Clade: Pancrustacea
- Class: Insecta
- Order: Coleoptera
- Suborder: Polyphaga
- Infraorder: Cucujiformia
- Family: Cerambycidae
- Genus: Eunidia
- Species: E. griseitarsis

Binomial name
- Eunidia griseitarsis Breuning, 1970

Species of beetle

Eunidia griseitarsis is a species of beetle in the family Cerambycidae. It was described by Stephan von Breuning in 1970.
