= Eunidia cylindricollis =

Scientific classification
- Kingdom: Animalia
- Phylum: Arthropoda
- Clade: Pancrustacea
- Class: Insecta
- Order: Coleoptera
- Suborder: Polyphaga
- Infraorder: Cucujiformia
- Family: Cerambycidae
- Genus: Eunidia
- Species: E. cylindricollis

Binomial name
- Eunidia cylindricollis Breuning, 1953

Synonyms
- Eunidia caffra (Fahraeus) Breuning & Teocchi, 1978

Species of beetle

Eunidia cylindricollis is a species of beetle in the family Cerambycidae. It was described by Stephan von Breuning in 1953.
