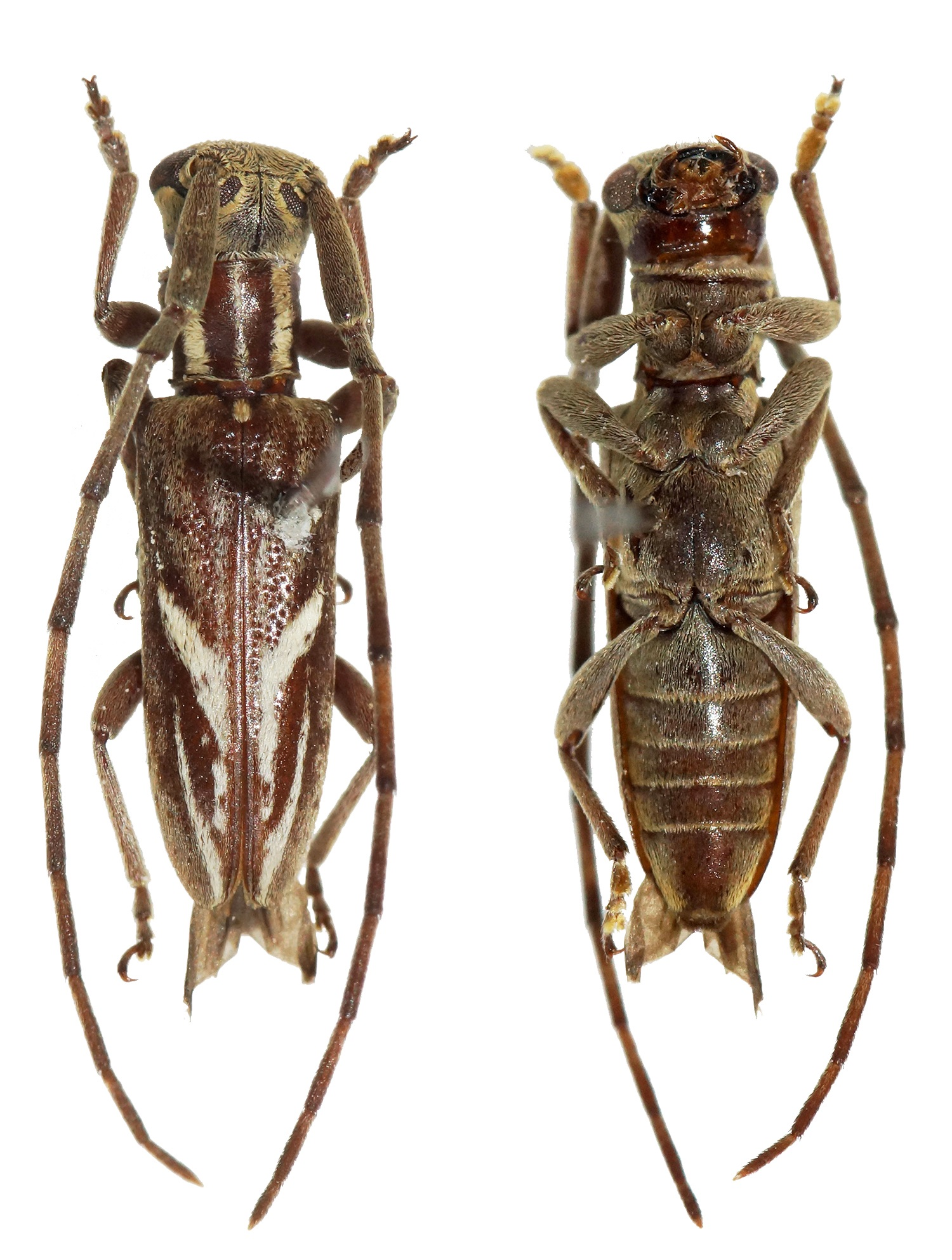

Scientific classification
- Kingdom: Animalia
- Phylum: Arthropoda
- Clade: Pancrustacea
- Class: Insecta
- Order: Coleoptera
- Suborder: Polyphaga
- Infraorder: Cucujiformia
- Family: Cerambycidae
- Genus: Eunidia
- Species: E. brunneopunctata

Binomial name
- Eunidia brunneopunctata Aurivillius, 1911

= Eunidia brunneopunctata =

Species of beetle

Eunidia brunneopunctata is a species of beetle in the family Cerambycidae. It was described by Per Olof Christopher Aurivillius in 1911. It is known from South Africa, Malawi, Angola, Kenya, Ethiopia, Mozambique, Botswana, Sudan, Namibia, Senegal, the Democratic Republic of the Congo, Tanzania, Somalia, and Uganda.

== Subspecies ==
- Eunidia brunneopunctata bouyeri Téocchi, Jiroux & Sudre, 2007
- Eunidia brunneopunctata brunneopunctata Aurivillius, 1911
- Eunidia brunneopunctata strigatoides Breuning, 1939
