= Eunidia cyanoptera =

Scientific classification
- Kingdom: Animalia
- Phylum: Arthropoda
- Clade: Pancrustacea
- Class: Insecta
- Order: Coleoptera
- Suborder: Polyphaga
- Infraorder: Cucujiformia
- Family: Cerambycidae
- Genus: Eunidia
- Species: E. cyanoptera

Binomial name
- Eunidia cyanoptera Aurivillius, 1910

Species of beetle

Eunidia cyanoptera is a species of beetle in the family Cerambycidae. It was described by Per Olof Christopher Aurivillius in 1910. It contains the variety Eunidia cyanoptera var. nigripes.
