= Eunidia nigrolateralis =

Scientific classification
- Kingdom: Animalia
- Phylum: Arthropoda
- Clade: Pancrustacea
- Class: Insecta
- Order: Coleoptera
- Suborder: Polyphaga
- Infraorder: Cucujiformia
- Family: Cerambycidae
- Genus: Eunidia
- Species: E. nigrolateralis

Binomial name
- Eunidia nigrolateralis Breuning, 1954

Species of beetle

Eunidia nigrolateralis is a species of beetle in the family Cerambycidae. It was described by Stephan von Breuning in 1954.
