= Eunidia nebulosa =

Scientific classification
- Kingdom: Animalia
- Phylum: Arthropoda
- Clade: Pancrustacea
- Class: Insecta
- Order: Coleoptera
- Suborder: Polyphaga
- Infraorder: Cucujiformia
- Family: Cerambycidae
- Genus: Eunidia
- Species: E. nebulosa

Binomial name
- Eunidia nebulosa Erichson, 1843

Species of beetle

Eunidia nebulosa is a species of beetle in the family Cerambycidae. It was described by Wilhelm Ferdinand Erichson in 1843. It is known from Australia, Senegal, Cameroon, Gabon, the Democratic Republic of the Congo, South Africa, Madagascar, Ethiopia, Ivory Coast, Kenya, Namibia, Angola, Niger, Saudi Arabia, Somalia, Mozambique, Tanzania, and Zimbabwe.

== Subspecies ==
- Eunidia nebulosa australica Thomson, 1868
- Eunidia nebulosa nebulosa Erichson, 1843
