= Eunidia quadrivittata =

Scientific classification
- Kingdom: Animalia
- Phylum: Arthropoda
- Clade: Pancrustacea
- Class: Insecta
- Order: Coleoptera
- Suborder: Polyphaga
- Infraorder: Cucujiformia
- Family: Cerambycidae
- Genus: Eunidia
- Species: E. quadrivittata

Binomial name
- Eunidia quadrivittata Breuning, 1938

Species of beetle

Eunidia quadrivittata is a species of beetle in the family Cerambycidae. It was described by Stephan von Breuning in 1938. It is known from Kenya and Somalia.
