= Eunidia dolosa =

Scientific classification
- Kingdom: Animalia
- Phylum: Arthropoda
- Clade: Pancrustacea
- Class: Insecta
- Order: Coleoptera
- Suborder: Polyphaga
- Infraorder: Cucujiformia
- Family: Cerambycidae
- Genus: Eunidia
- Species: E. dolosa

Binomial name
- Eunidia dolosa (Pascoe, 1859)

Species of beetle

Eunidia dolosa is a species of beetle in the family Cerambycidae. It was described by Francis Polkinghorne Pascoe in 1859.
