= Eunidia fulvida =

Scientific classification
- Kingdom: Animalia
- Phylum: Arthropoda
- Clade: Pancrustacea
- Class: Insecta
- Order: Coleoptera
- Suborder: Polyphaga
- Infraorder: Cucujiformia
- Family: Cerambycidae
- Genus: Eunidia
- Species: E. fulvida

Binomial name
- Eunidia fulvida (Pascoe, 1856)

Synonyms
- Anomoesia fulvida Pascoe, 1856; Eunidia fulva Pascoe, 1864; Eunidia fulvida m. aureonigra Teocchi & Sudre, 2002

Species of beetle

Eunidia fulvida is a species of beetle in the family Cerambycidae. It was described by Francis Polkinghorne Pascoe in 1856, originally under the genus Anomoesia.
