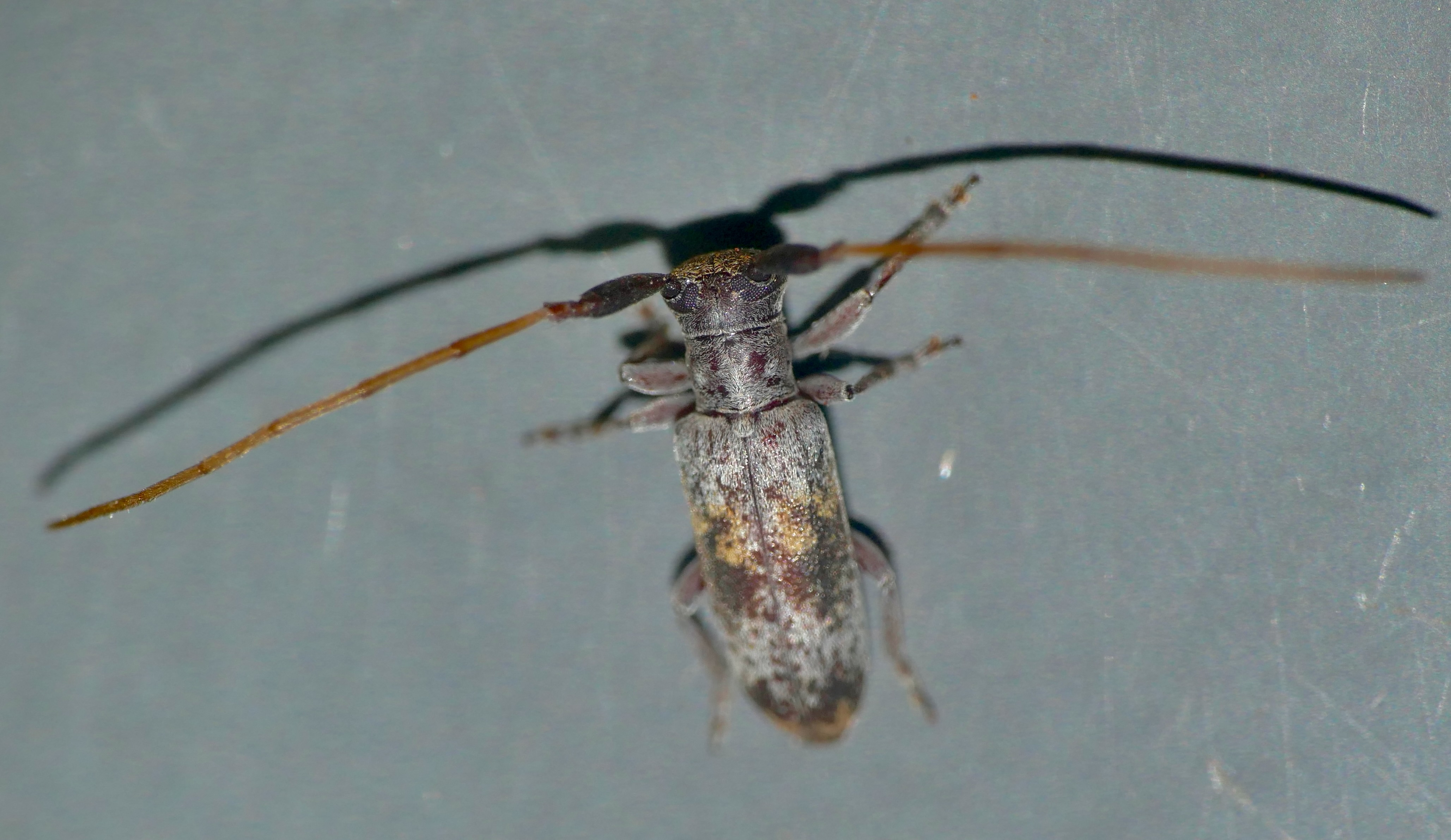

Scientific classification
- Kingdom: Animalia
- Phylum: Arthropoda
- Clade: Pancrustacea
- Class: Insecta
- Order: Coleoptera
- Suborder: Polyphaga
- Infraorder: Cucujiformia
- Family: Cerambycidae
- Genus: Eunidia
- Species: E. subtergrisea

Binomial name
- Eunidia subtergrisea Thomson, 1868

= Eunidia subtergrisea =

Species of beetle

Eunidia subtergrisea is a species of beetle in the family Cerambycidae. It was described by Thomson in 1868.
