= Eunidia rufescens =

Scientific classification
- Kingdom: Animalia
- Phylum: Arthropoda
- Clade: Pancrustacea
- Class: Insecta
- Order: Coleoptera
- Suborder: Polyphaga
- Infraorder: Cucujiformia
- Family: Cerambycidae
- Genus: Eunidia
- Species: E. rufescens

Binomial name
- Eunidia rufescens Breuning, 1939

Synonyms
- Eunidia rubra Breuning, 1958; Eunidia rufescens rufescens (Breuning) Breuning, 1963; Eunidia rufuloides m. rufoampliata Breuning, 1986; Eunidia uniformis Breuning, 1940; Eunidia zambesiana Breuning, 1955

Species of beetle

Eunidia rufescens is a species of beetle in the family Cerambycidae. It was described by Stephan von Breuning in 1939. It is known from Mozambique, Kenya, and South Africa. It contains the varietas Eunidia rufescens var. holatripes.
