= Eunidia mimica =

Scientific classification
- Kingdom: Animalia
- Phylum: Arthropoda
- Clade: Pancrustacea
- Class: Insecta
- Order: Coleoptera
- Suborder: Polyphaga
- Infraorder: Cucujiformia
- Family: Cerambycidae
- Genus: Eunidia
- Species: E. mimica

Binomial name
- Eunidia mimica Jordan, 1903

Synonyms
- Eunidia tricarinipennis Breuning, 1965

Species of beetle

Eunidia mimica is a species of beetle in the family Cerambycidae. It was described by Karl Jordan in 1903.
