= Eunidia subnigra =

Scientific classification
- Kingdom: Animalia
- Phylum: Arthropoda
- Clade: Pancrustacea
- Class: Insecta
- Order: Coleoptera
- Suborder: Polyphaga
- Infraorder: Cucujiformia
- Family: Cerambycidae
- Genus: Eunidia
- Species: E. subnigra

Binomial name
- Eunidia subnigra Breuning, 1955

Species of beetle

Eunidia subnigra is a species of beetle in the family Cerambycidae. It was described by Stephan von Breuning in 1955.
