= Eunidia annulata =

Scientific classification
- Kingdom: Animalia
- Phylum: Arthropoda
- Clade: Pancrustacea
- Class: Insecta
- Order: Coleoptera
- Suborder: Polyphaga
- Infraorder: Cucujiformia
- Family: Cerambycidae
- Genus: Eunidia
- Species: E. annulata

Binomial name
- Eunidia annulata Aurivillius, 1924

Species of beetle

Eunidia annulata is a species of beetle in the family Cerambycidae. It was described by Per Olof Christopher Aurivillius in 1924.

== Subspecies ==
- Eunidia annulata annulata Aurivillius, 1924
- Eunidia annulata flavifrons Breuning, 1963
