= Eunidia kristenseni =

Scientific classification
- Kingdom: Animalia
- Phylum: Arthropoda
- Clade: Pancrustacea
- Class: Insecta
- Order: Coleoptera
- Suborder: Polyphaga
- Infraorder: Cucujiformia
- Family: Cerambycidae
- Genus: Eunidia
- Species: E. kristenseni

Binomial name
- Eunidia kristenseni Aurivillius, 1911

Species of beetle

Eunidia kristenseni is a species of beetle in the family Cerambycidae. It was described by Per Olof Christopher Aurivillius in 1911. It is known from tropical Africa.

== Subspecies ==
- Eunidia kristenseni kristenseni Aurivillius, 1911
- Eunidia kristenseni sabiensis Breuning, 1981

== Varieties ==
- Eunidia kristenseni var. albida Breuning, 1940
- Eunidia kristenseni var. flavomaculata Breuning, 1942
