= Eunidia vestigialis =

Scientific classification
- Kingdom: Animalia
- Phylum: Arthropoda
- Clade: Pancrustacea
- Class: Insecta
- Order: Coleoptera
- Suborder: Polyphaga
- Infraorder: Cucujiformia
- Family: Cerambycidae
- Genus: Eunidia
- Species: E. vestigialis

Binomial name
- Eunidia vestigialis (Pascoe, 1864)

Synonyms
- Syessita vestigialis Pascoe, 1864

Species of beetle

Eunidia vestigialis is a species of beetle in the family Cerambycidae. It was described by Francis Polkinghorne Pascoe in 1864.
