= Eunidia tubericollis =

Scientific classification
- Kingdom: Animalia
- Phylum: Arthropoda
- Clade: Pancrustacea
- Class: Insecta
- Order: Coleoptera
- Suborder: Polyphaga
- Infraorder: Cucujiformia
- Family: Cerambycidae
- Genus: Eunidia
- Species: E. tubericollis

Binomial name
- Eunidia tubericollis Breuning, 1961

Synonyms
- Eunidia dilaceratoides Breuning, 1986; Eunidia septemvittipennis Breuning, 1967; Eunidia tubericollis m. latefasciata Teocchi, 1992

Species of beetle

Eunidia tubericollis is a species of beetle in the family Cerambycidae. It was described by Stephan von Breuning in 1961. It is known from Tanzania, Namibia, Zambia, South Africa, the Democratic Republic of the Congo, and Zimbabwe.
