= Eunidia flavovittata =

Scientific classification
- Kingdom: Animalia
- Phylum: Arthropoda
- Clade: Pancrustacea
- Class: Insecta
- Order: Coleoptera
- Suborder: Polyphaga
- Infraorder: Cucujiformia
- Family: Cerambycidae
- Genus: Eunidia
- Species: E. flavovittata

Binomial name
- Eunidia flavovittata Breuning, 1938

Synonyms
- Eunidia flavovittata flavipes Breuning, 1969; Eunidia flavovittata flavovittata Breuning, 1938; Eunidia flavovittata ituriensis Breuning, 1972; Eunidia flavovittata latevittipennis Breuning, 1969

Species of beetle

Eunidia flavovittata is a species of beetle in the family Cerambycidae. It was described by Stephan von Breuning in 1938.
