= Eunidia strigata =

Scientific classification
- Kingdom: Animalia
- Phylum: Arthropoda
- Clade: Pancrustacea
- Class: Insecta
- Order: Coleoptera
- Suborder: Polyphaga
- Infraorder: Cucujiformia
- Family: Cerambycidae
- Genus: Eunidia
- Species: E. strigata

Binomial name
- Eunidia strigata Fahraeus, 1872

Synonyms
- Eunidia pseudostrigosa Breuning, 1939; Eunidia pusilla Distant, 1906; Eunidia strigata m. alboampliata Breuning, 1981; Tritomicrus dorsopictus Fairmaire, 1898

Species of beetle

Eunidia strigata is a species of beetle in the family Cerambycidae. It was described by Fahraeus in 1872. It contains the varietas Eunidia strigata var. damarensis.
