= Eunidia flavicollis =

Scientific classification
- Kingdom: Animalia
- Phylum: Arthropoda
- Clade: Pancrustacea
- Class: Insecta
- Order: Coleoptera
- Suborder: Polyphaga
- Infraorder: Cucujiformia
- Family: Cerambycidae
- Genus: Eunidia
- Species: E. flavicollis

Binomial name
- Eunidia flavicollis Breuning, 1942

Synonyms
- Eunidia caffra socia m. flavicollis (Breuning) Breuning & Teocchi, 1978; Eunidia socia m. flavicollis (Breuning) Breuning, 1957; Eunidia somalica Breuning, 1977

Species of beetle

Eunidia flavicollis is a species of beetle belonging to the family Cerambycidae. It was described by Stephan von Breuning in 1942.
