= Eunidia obliquealbovittata =

Scientific classification
- Kingdom: Animalia
- Phylum: Arthropoda
- Clade: Pancrustacea
- Class: Insecta
- Order: Coleoptera
- Suborder: Polyphaga
- Infraorder: Cucujiformia
- Family: Cerambycidae
- Genus: Eunidia
- Species: E. obliquealbovittata

Binomial name
- Eunidia obliquealbovittata Hunt & Breuning, 1957

Species of beetle

Eunidia obliquealbovittata is a species of beetle in the family Cerambycidae. It was described by Hunt and Stephan von Breuning in 1957.
