= Eunidia camerunica =

Scientific classification
- Kingdom: Animalia
- Phylum: Arthropoda
- Clade: Pancrustacea
- Class: Insecta
- Order: Coleoptera
- Suborder: Polyphaga
- Infraorder: Cucujiformia
- Family: Cerambycidae
- Genus: Eunidia
- Species: E. camerunica

Binomial name
- Eunidia camerunica Téocchi, Sudre & Jiroux, 2010

Synonyms
- Eunidia deceptrix camerunica Téocchi, 1994

Species of beetle

Eunidia camerunica is a species of beetle in the family Cerambycidae. It was described by Téocchi, Sudre and Jiroux in 2010.

== Subspecies ==
- Eunidia camerunica camerunica Téocchi, 1994
- Eunidia camerunica gabonicola Téocchi, Jiroux & Sudre, 2004
