= Eunidia dolosoides =

Scientific classification
- Kingdom: Animalia
- Phylum: Arthropoda
- Clade: Pancrustacea
- Class: Insecta
- Order: Coleoptera
- Suborder: Polyphaga
- Infraorder: Cucujiformia
- Family: Cerambycidae
- Genus: Eunidia
- Species: E. dolosoides

Binomial name
- Eunidia dolosoides Téocchi, Jiroux & Sudre, 2004

Species of beetle

Eunidia dolosoides is a species of beetle in the family Cerambycidae. It was described by Téocchi, Jiroux and Sudre in 2004.
