= Eunidia mussardi =

Scientific classification
- Kingdom: Animalia
- Phylum: Arthropoda
- Clade: Pancrustacea
- Class: Insecta
- Order: Coleoptera
- Suborder: Polyphaga
- Infraorder: Cucujiformia
- Family: Cerambycidae
- Genus: Eunidia
- Species: E. mussardi

Binomial name
- Eunidia mussardi Lepesme & Breuning, 1957

Species of beetle

Eunidia mussardi is a species of beetle in the family Cerambycidae. It was described by Lepesme and Stephan von Breuning in 1957.
