= Eunidia bifasciata =

Scientific classification
- Kingdom: Animalia
- Phylum: Arthropoda
- Clade: Pancrustacea
- Class: Insecta
- Order: Coleoptera
- Suborder: Polyphaga
- Infraorder: Cucujiformia
- Family: Cerambycidae
- Genus: Eunidia
- Species: E. bifasciata

Binomial name
- Eunidia bifasciata Aurivillius, 1911

Synonyms
- Eunidia ambigua Breuning, 1938; Eunidia subsenilis Breuning, 1954

Species of beetle

Eunidia bifasciata is a species of beetle in the family Cerambycidae. It was described by Per Olof Christopher Aurivillius in 1911.
