= Eunidia nigroapicalis =

Scientific classification
- Kingdom: Animalia
- Phylum: Arthropoda
- Clade: Pancrustacea
- Class: Insecta
- Order: Coleoptera
- Suborder: Polyphaga
- Infraorder: Cucujiformia
- Family: Cerambycidae
- Genus: Eunidia
- Species: E. nigroapicalis

Binomial name
- Eunidia nigroapicalis (Pic, 1925)

Synonyms
- Boucardia nigroapicalis Pic, 1925

Species of beetle

Eunidia nigroapicalis is a species of beetle in the family Cerambycidae. It was described by Maurice Pic in 1925. It is known from Sumatra and Borneo.
