= Eunidia spinicornis =

Scientific classification
- Kingdom: Animalia
- Phylum: Arthropoda
- Clade: Pancrustacea
- Class: Insecta
- Order: Coleoptera
- Suborder: Polyphaga
- Infraorder: Cucujiformia
- Family: Cerambycidae
- Genus: Eunidia
- Species: E. spinicornis

Binomial name
- Eunidia spinicornis (Péringuey, 1888)

Species of beetle

Eunidia spinicornis is a species of beetle in the family Cerambycidae. It was described by Péringuey in 1888.
