= Eunidia kivuana =

Scientific classification
- Kingdom: Animalia
- Phylum: Arthropoda
- Clade: Pancrustacea
- Class: Insecta
- Order: Coleoptera
- Suborder: Polyphaga
- Infraorder: Cucujiformia
- Family: Cerambycidae
- Genus: Eunidia
- Species: E. kivuana

Binomial name
- Eunidia kivuana Breuning, 1952

Species of beetle

Eunidia kivuana is a species of beetle in the family Cerambycidae. It was described by Stephan von Breuning in 1952.

== Subspecies ==
- Eunidia kivuana kivuana Breuning, 1952
- Eunidia kivuana tanzanicola Téocchi, 1998
