= Eunidia fallaciosa =

Scientific classification
- Kingdom: Animalia
- Phylum: Arthropoda
- Clade: Pancrustacea
- Class: Insecta
- Order: Coleoptera
- Suborder: Polyphaga
- Infraorder: Cucujiformia
- Family: Cerambycidae
- Genus: Eunidia
- Species: E. fallaciosa

Binomial name
- Eunidia fallaciosa Breuning, 1939

Synonyms
- Eunidia ochreolineata Breuning, 1940; Eunidia quadrifasciata Breuning, 1940

Species of beetle

Eunidia fallaciosa is a species of beetle in the family Cerambycidae. It was described by Stephan von Breuning in 1939. It is known from Somalia.

== Subspecies ==
- Eunidia fallaciosa elongata Téocchi & Sudre, 2002
- Eunidia fallaciosa fallaciosa Breuning, 1939
