= Eunidia caffra =

Scientific classification
- Kingdom: Animalia
- Phylum: Arthropoda
- Clade: Pancrustacea
- Class: Insecta
- Order: Coleoptera
- Suborder: Polyphaga
- Infraorder: Cucujiformia
- Family: Cerambycidae
- Genus: Eunidia
- Species: E. caffra

Binomial name
- Eunidia caffra Fahraeus, 1872

Synonyms
- Eunidia modesta Gahan, 1904

Species of beetle

Eunidia caffra is a species of beetle in the family Cerambycidae. It was described by Fahraeus in 1872.

== Subspecies ==
- Eunidia caffra caffra Fahraeus, 1872
- Eunidia caffra socia Gahan, 1909
