= Eunidia yemeniensis =

Scientific classification
- Kingdom: Animalia
- Phylum: Arthropoda
- Clade: Pancrustacea
- Class: Insecta
- Order: Coleoptera
- Suborder: Polyphaga
- Infraorder: Cucujiformia
- Family: Cerambycidae
- Genus: Eunidia
- Species: E. yemeniensis

Binomial name
- Eunidia yemeniensis Breuning, 1968

Species of beetle

Eunidia yemeniensis is a species of beetle in the family Cerambycidae. It was described by Stephan von Breuning in 1968. It is known from Yemen.
