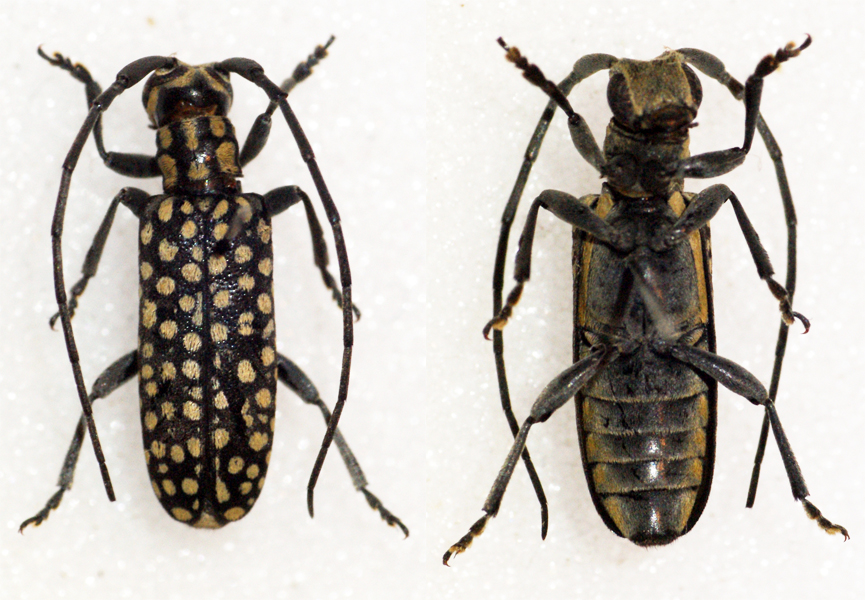
- Eunidia guttulata

Scientific classification
- Kingdom: Animalia
- Phylum: Arthropoda
- Class: Insecta
- Order: Coleoptera
- Suborder: Polyphaga
- Infraorder: Cucujiformia
- Family: Cerambycidae
- Tribe: Eunidiini
- Genus: Eunidia; Erichson, 1843

Species
- See text

= Eunidia =

Genus of beetles

Eunidia is a genus of longhorn beetles of the subfamily Lamiinae.

== Species ==
The genus contains the following species:

- Eunidia adlbaueri Téocchi, Sudre & Jiroux, 2010
- Eunidia affinis Breuning, 1939
- Eunidia albescens Breuning, 1939
- Eunidia albicans Breuning, 1939
- Eunidia alboapicalis Breuning,
- Eunidia albolineata Breuning, 1959
- Eunidia albolineatipennis Breuning, 1968
- Eunidia albonotata Pic, 1933
- Eunidia albopicta Breuning, 1939
- Eunidia albopubens Hunt & Breuning, 1957
- Eunidia albosignata Breuning, 1972
- Eunidia alboterminata Breuning, 1960
- Eunidia alboterminatoides Breuning, 1977
- Eunidia albovariegata Breuning, 1960
- Eunidia allardi Breuning, 1964
- Eunidia alternata Aurivillius, 1911
- Eunidia andamanica Breuning, 1939
- Eunidia angolana Lepesme, 1953
- Eunidia annulata Aurivillius, 1924
- Eunidia annulicornis Breuning, 1953
- Eunidia anteflava Lepesme & Breuning, 1953
- Eunidia apicalis Aurivillius, 1907
- Eunidia apicefusca Breuning, 1939
- Eunidia apicemaculata Breuning, 1939
- Eunidia arabensis Breuning, 1969
- Eunidia argentea Sudre & Téocchi, 2002
- Eunidia aspersa Gahan, 1904
- Eunidia atripes Breuning, 1960
- Eunidia aureicollis Breuning, 1976
- Eunidia auricollis Breuning, 1957
- Eunidia batesi Olliff, 1889
- Eunidia bella Breuning, 1942
- Eunidia bicolor Gardner, 1936
- Eunidia bicoloripennis Breuning, 1974
- Eunidia bifasciata Aurivillius, 1911
- Eunidia bifuscoplagiata Breuning, 1954
- Eunidia bigriseovittata Breuning, 1962
- Eunidia biplagiata Aurivillius, 1925
- Eunidia bituberata Breuning, 1939
- Eunidia boafoi Breuning, 1978
- Eunidia bremeri Breuning, 1981
- Eunidia breuningiae Villiers, 1951
- Eunidia brunneopunctata Aurivillius, 1911
- Eunidia brunneovittata Breuning, 1939
- Eunidia brunneovittipennis Breuning, 1954
- Eunidia caffra Fahraeus, 1872
- Eunidia camerunica Téocchi, Sudre & Jiroux, 2010
- Eunidia castanoptera Aurivillius, 1920
- Eunidia ceylanica Thomson, 1868
- Eunidia clarkeana Breuning, 1977
- Eunidia clarkei Breuning, 1974
- Eunidia coiffaiti Breuning, 1977
- Eunidia conradti Breuning, 1960
- Eunidia cordifera Aurivillius, 1914
- Eunidia crassicornis Breuning, 1954
- Eunidia cruciata Aurivillius, 1925
- Eunidia cyanoptera Aurivillius, 1910
- Eunidia cylindrica Breuning, 1939
- Eunidia cylindricollis Breuning, 1953
- Eunidia deceptrix Aurivillius, 1925
- Eunidia delkeskampi Breuning, 1960
- Eunidia densealbosparsa Breuning, 1954
- Eunidia dilacerata Aurivillius, 1925
- Eunidia discobivittata Breuning, 1939
- Eunidia discomaculata Breuning, 1940
- Eunidia discounivittata Breuning, 1953
- Eunidia discovittata Breuning, 1939
- Eunidia diversimembris Breuning, 1969
- Eunidia divisa (Pascoe, 1864)
- Eunidia djiboutiana Breuning, 1974
- Eunidia dolosa (Pascoe, 1859)
- Eunidia dolosoides Téocchi, Jiroux & Sudre, 2004
- Eunidia duffyana Breuning, 1957
- Eunidia duffyi Breuning, 1957
- Eunidia duplicata (Pascoe, 1864)
- Eunidia endroedyi Breuning, 1981
- Eunidia euzonata Gahan, 1904
- Eunidia exigua Aurivillius, 1907
- Eunidia fallaciosa Breuning, 1939
- Eunidia fasciata Gahan, 1904
- Eunidia femoralis Aurivillius, 1907
- Eunidia flava Breuning, 1952
- Eunidia flavicans Breuning, 1954
- Eunidia flavicollis Breuning, 1942
- Eunidia flavoapicata Breuning, 1939
- Eunidia flavointerruptovittata Breuning, 1969
- Eunidia flavomarmorata Breuning, 1939
- Eunidia flavoornata Breuning, 1981
- Eunidia flavopicta Breuning, 1939
- Eunidia flavosignata Breuning, 1939
- Eunidia flavovariegata Breuning, 1961
- Eunidia flavovittata Breuning, 1938
- Eunidia forticornis Breuning, 1943
- Eunidia fulvescens Breuning, 1976
- Eunidia fulvida (Pascoe, 1856)
- Eunidia fusca Breuning, 1953
- Eunidia fuscoapicalis Breuning, 1939
- Eunidia fuscoapicipennis Breuning, 1967
- Eunidia fuscomaculata Breuning, 1939
- Eunidia fuscomarmorata Breuning, 1962
- Eunidia fuscosignata Breuning, 1954
- Eunidia fuscostictica Breuning, 1939
- Eunidia fuscovittata Breuning, 1939
- Eunidia fuscovitticollis Breuning, 1958
- Eunidia ghanaensis Breuning, 1977
- Eunidia griseitarsis Breuning, 1970
- Eunidia griseolineata Breuning, 1939
- Eunidia guttulata (Coquerel, 1851)
- Eunidia haplotrita Aurivillius, 1911
- Eunidia holoflava Breuning, 1965
- Eunidia holofusca Breuning, 1977
- Eunidia holonigra Breuning, 1954
- Eunidia holorufa Breuning, 1977
- Eunidia hovorkai Téocchi, Jiroux & Sudre, 2004
- Eunidia idactiformis Breuning, 1954
- Eunidia indistincta Breuning, 1939
- Eunidia infirma Breuning, 1939
- Eunidia infuscata Breuning, 1939
- Eunidia jeanneli Breuning, 1939
- Eunidia joveri Lepesme & Breuning, 1953
- Eunidia kinduensis Breuning, 1948
- Eunidia kivuana Breuning, 1952
- Eunidia kivuensis Breuning, 1948
- Eunidia kristenseni Aurivillius, 1911
- Eunidia laosensis Breuning, 1964
- Eunidia lateralis Gahan, 1893
- Eunidia lateraloides Breuning, 1963
- Eunidia laterialba Breuning, 1948
- Eunidia lerouxi Téocchi & Sudre, 2002
- Eunidia lindblomi Aurivillius, 1925
- Eunidia lineata Aurivillius, 1911
- Eunidia lineatoides Breuning, 1942
- Eunidia lizleri Téocchi & Sudre, 2002
- Eunidia lomii Breuning, 1938
- Eunidia lubumbashii Breuning, 1976
- Eunidia lujai Breuning, 1951
- Eunidia lycas Breuning, 1981
- Eunidia macrophtalma Breuning, 1940
- Eunidia maculiventris Thomson, 1868
- Eunidia major Breuning, 1977
- Eunidia marmorea Fairmaire, 1892
- Eunidia mediomaculata Breuning, 1938
- Eunidia mediomaculatoides Breuning, 1981
- Eunidia mediosignata Breuning, 1939
- Eunidia mehli Holzschuh, 1986
- Eunidia meleagris Aurivillius, 1926
- Eunidia microphthalma Breuning, 1957
- Eunidia mimica Jordan, 1903
- Eunidia minima Breuning, 1942
- Eunidia minimoides Breuning, 1965
- Eunidia minor Breuning, 1954
- Eunidia mirei Breuning, 1967
- Eunidia mombasae Breuning, 1983
- Eunidia mourgliae Breuning & Téocchi, 1983
- Eunidia mucorea Gahan, 1898
- Eunidia multialboguttata Breuning, 1957
- Eunidia multinigromaculata Breuning, 1967
- Eunidia mussardi Lepesme & Breuning, 1957
- Eunidia naviauxi Villiers, 1977
- Eunidia nebulosa Erichson, 1843
- Eunidia nigeriae Breuning, 1950
- Eunidia nigricans Breuning, 1942
- Eunidia nigroapicalis (Pic, 1925)
- Eunidia nigroapicaloides Breuning, 1976
- Eunidia nigrolateralis Breuning, 1954
- Eunidia nigrosignata Breuning, 1939
- Eunidia nigroterminata Breuning, 1949
- Eunidia nigrovittata Breuning, 1939
- Eunidia nigrovittipennis Breuning, 1961
- Eunidia obliquealbovittata Hunt & Breuning, 1957
- Eunidia obliquealbovittatoides Breuning, 1986
- Eunidia obliqueflavovittata Breuning, 1981
- Eunidia obliquevittata Breuning, 1940
- Eunidia obliquevittipennis Breuning, 1971
- Eunidia obliquevittulipennis Breuning, 1977
- Eunidia ochraceovittata Breuning, 1939
- Eunidia ochreoapicalis Breuning, 1981
- Eunidia ochreomarmorata Breuning, 1939
- Eunidia ochreoornata Breuning, 1970
- Eunidia ochreopicta Breuning, 1964
- Eunidia octoplagiata Breuning, 1955
- Eunidia okahandjae Breuning, 1943
- Eunidia olivacea Breuning, 1954
- Eunidia opima Holzschuh, 1986
- Eunidia ornata Breuning, 1960
- Eunidia pararothkirchi Breuning, 1977
- Eunidia parasenegalensis Breuning, 1977
- Eunidia paraspilota Téocchi, Jiroux & Sudre, 2004
- Eunidia parastrigata Breuning, 1978
- Eunidia partegriseicornis Breuning, 1976
- Eunidia partenigroantennalis Breuning, 1969
- Eunidia partenigrofemoralis Breuning, 1977
- Eunidia philippinarum Aurivillius, 1922
- Eunidia philippinensis Aurivillius, 1922
- Eunidia piperita Gahan, 1898
- Eunidia plagiata Gahan, 1898
- Eunidia postfasciata Breuning, 1947
- Eunidia preapicefasciata Breuning, 1957
- Eunidia propinqua Breuning, 1939
- Eunidia pseudannulicornis Breuning, 1964
- Eunidia pseudocastanoptera Breuning, 1954
- Eunidia pseudodeceptrix Breuning, 1957
- Eunidia pseudosenilis Breuning, 1970
- Eunidia pseudosocia Breuning, 1954
- Eunidia pseudostrigata Breuning, 1977
- Eunidia pulchra Breuning, 1939
- Eunidia punctulicollis Breuning, 1957
- Eunidia pygmaea Fahraeus, 1872
- Eunidia quadrialbosignata Breuning, 1965
- Eunidia quadrialbovittata Breuning, 1961
- Eunidia quadricincta Aurivillius, 1911
- Eunidia quadrivittata Breuning, 1938
- Eunidia quinquemaculata Breuning, 1939
- Eunidia raffrayi Breuning, 1970
- Eunidia renaudi Breuning, 1961
- Eunidia rondoni Breuning, 1962
- Eunidia rothkirchi Breuning, 1954
- Eunidia rougemonti Breuning, 1977
- Eunidia rufa Aurivillius, 1921
- Eunidia rufescens Breuning, 1939
- Eunidia ruficornis Breuning, 1949
- Eunidia rufina Breuning, 1953
- Eunidia rufolineata Breuning, 1939
- Eunidia rufula (Fairmaire, 1905)
- Eunidia rufulicornis Breuning, 1954
- Eunidia rufuloides Breuning, 1939
- Eunidia saucissea Breuning & Téocchi, 1978
- Eunidia savioi (Pic, 1925)
- Eunidia scorteccii Breuning, 1959
- Eunidia scotti Breuning, 1939
- Eunidia semirufa Aurivillius, 1916
- Eunidia setosa Breuning, 1938
- Eunidia sexplagiata Breuning, 1954
- Eunidia similis Breuning, 1942
- Eunidia simplex Gahan, 1890
- Eunidia simplicior Breuning, 1939
- Eunidia somaliensis Breuning, 1948
- Eunidia spilota Gahan, 1904
- Eunidia spilotoides Breuning, 1939
- Eunidia spinicornis (Péringuey, 1888)
- Eunidia splendida Breuning, 1954
- Eunidia stramentosa Breuning, 1939
- Eunidia stramentosipennis Breuning, 1954
- Eunidia strigata Fahraeus, 1872
- Eunidia subalbicans Breuning, 1967
- Eunidia subannulicornis Breuning, 1968
- Eunidia subbifasciata (Heller, 1924)
- Eunidia subfasciata Gahan, 1898
- Eunidia subinfirma Breuning, 1955
- Eunidia subnebulosa Breuning, 1961
- Eunidia subnigra Breuning, 1955
- Eunidia subpygmaea Breuning, 1965
- Eunidia subsimilis Breuning, 1960
- Eunidia subteralba Breuning, 1942
- Eunidia subtergrisea Thomson, 1868
- Eunidia subtesselata Gahan, 1909
- Eunidia subtimida Breuning, 1954
- Eunidia subvagepicta Breuning, 1963
- Eunidia sulphurea Aurivillius, 1925
- Eunidia suturealba Breuning, 1942
- Eunidia suturebrunnea Breuning, 1977
- Eunidia tanzanicola Téocchi & Sudre, 2003
- Eunidia theresae Breuning, 1939
- Eunidia thomensis Breuning, 1970
- Eunidia thomseni Distant, 1898
- Eunidia timida Pascoe, 1864
- Eunidia transversefasciata Breuning & Jong, 1941
- Eunidia transversevittata Breuning, 1940
- Eunidia trialbofasciata Breuning, 1960
- Eunidia tricolor Breuning, 1962
- Eunidia trifasciata Aurivillius, 1923
- Eunidia trifuscopunctata Breuning, 1948
- Eunidia tripunctata Aurivillius, 1911
- Eunidia trivittata Aurivillius, 1927
- Eunidia trivitticollis Téocchi & Sudre, 2002
- Eunidia tubericollis Breuning, 1961
- Eunidia unicolor Breuning, 1950
- Eunidia unicoloricornis Breuning, 1962
- Eunidia unifuscomaculata Breuning, 1960
- Eunidia vagefasciata Breuning, 1955
- Eunidia vagefuscomaculata Breuning, 1969
- Eunidia vageguttata Breuning, 1939
- Eunidia vagemarmorata Breuning, 1954
- Eunidia vagepicta Breuning, 1957
- Eunidia vagevittata Breuning, 1939
- Eunidia vansoni Breuning, 1981
- Eunidia varicoloripennis Breuning, 1969
- Eunidia varicornis Breuning, 1961
- Eunidia variegata (Thomson, 1857)
- Eunidia varipes Breuning, 1950
- Eunidia vestigialis (Pascoe, 1864)
- Eunidia vittata (Pic, 1932)
- Eunidia vitticollis Breuning, 1939
- Eunidia wittei Breuning, 1940
- Eunidia xyliae Gardner, 1941
- Eunidia yemeniensis Breuning, 1968
- Eunidia ziczac Breuning, 1939
