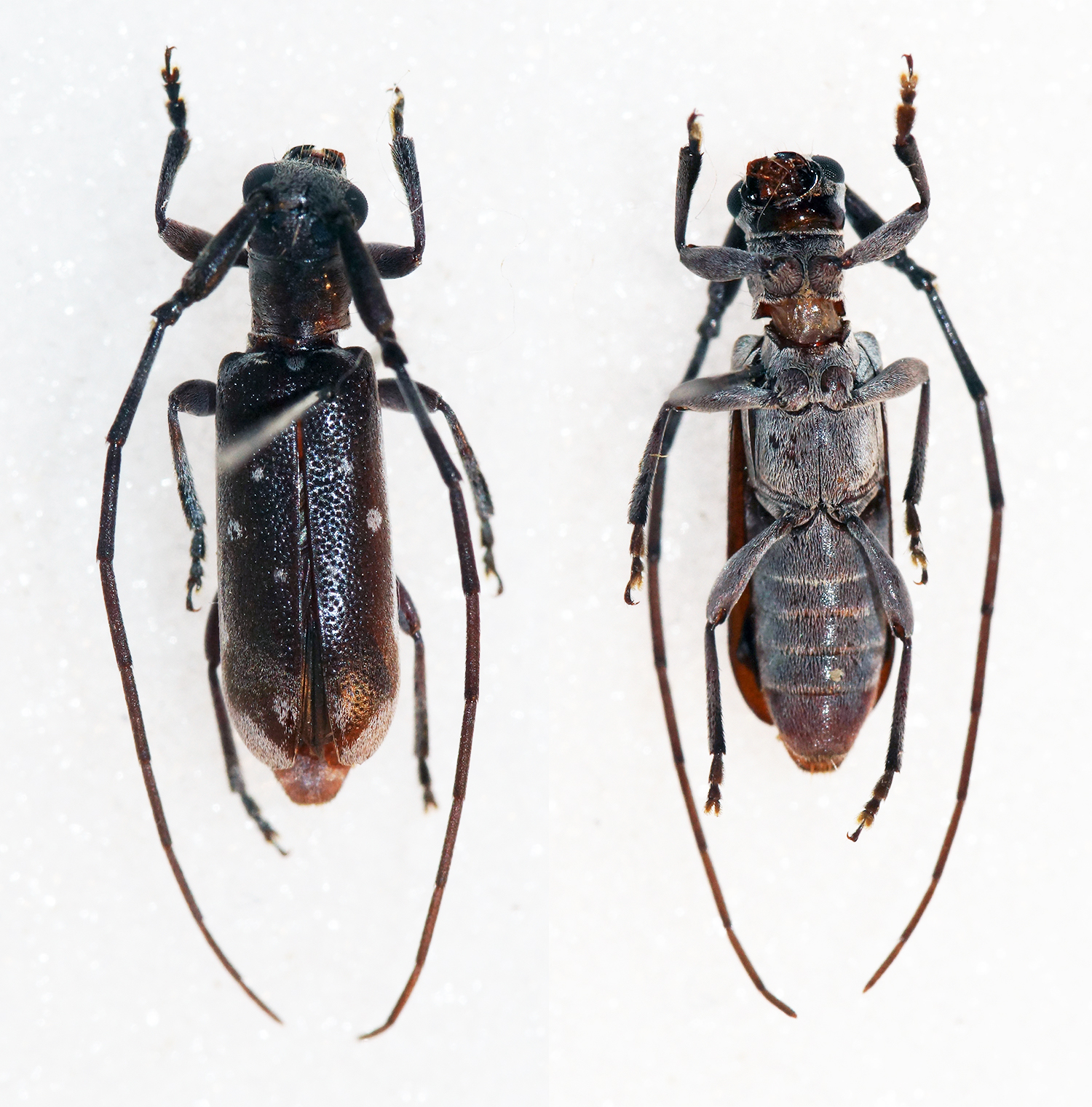

Scientific classification
- Kingdom: Animalia
- Phylum: Arthropoda
- Clade: Pancrustacea
- Class: Insecta
- Order: Coleoptera
- Suborder: Polyphaga
- Infraorder: Cucujiformia
- Family: Cerambycidae
- Genus: Eunidia
- Species: E. thomseni

Binomial name
- Eunidia thomseni Distant, 1898

Synonyms
- Eunidia thomsoni Distant, 1898 (misspelling)

= Eunidia thomseni =

Species of beetle

Eunidia thomseni is a species of beetle in the family Cerambycidae. It was described by William Lucas Distant in 1898. It is known from Tanzania, Cameroon, Chad, Niger, Ethiopia, Senegal, Mozambique, Botswana, Namibia, Saudi Arabia, the Central African Republic, Somalia, Uganda, South Africa, Yemen, Kenya, and Zimbabwe.

== Variety ==
- Eunidia thomseni var. albietosa Breuning, 1957
- Eunidia thomseni var. ferrandii Aurivillius, 1926
- Eunidia thomseni var. guttata Breuning, 1957
