= Eunidia maculiventris =

Scientific classification
- Kingdom: Animalia
- Phylum: Arthropoda
- Clade: Pancrustacea
- Class: Insecta
- Order: Coleoptera
- Suborder: Polyphaga
- Infraorder: Cucujiformia
- Family: Cerambycidae
- Genus: Eunidia
- Species: E. maculiventris

Binomial name
- Eunidia maculiventris Thomson, 1868

Species of beetle

Eunidia maculiventris is a species of beetle in the family Cerambycidae. It was described by Thomson in 1868.
