= Eunidia rufa =

Scientific classification
- Kingdom: Animalia
- Phylum: Arthropoda
- Clade: Pancrustacea
- Class: Insecta
- Order: Coleoptera
- Suborder: Polyphaga
- Infraorder: Cucujiformia
- Family: Cerambycidae
- Genus: Eunidia
- Species: E. rufa

Binomial name
- Eunidia rufa Aurivillius, 1921

Synonyms
- Eunidia diversifemoralis Hunt & Breuning, 1966

Species of beetle

Eunidia rufa is a species of beetle in the family Cerambycidae. It was described by Per Olof Christopher Aurivillius in 1921.
