= Eunidia olivacea =

Scientific classification
- Kingdom: Animalia
- Phylum: Arthropoda
- Clade: Pancrustacea
- Class: Insecta
- Order: Coleoptera
- Suborder: Polyphaga
- Infraorder: Cucujiformia
- Family: Cerambycidae
- Genus: Eunidia
- Species: E. olivacea

Binomial name
- Eunidia olivacea Breuning, 1954

Species of beetle

Eunidia olivacea is a species of beetle in the family Cerambycidae. It was described by Stephan von Breuning in 1954. It contains the varietas Eunidia olivacea var. trialbosignata.
