= Eunidia tanzanicola =

Scientific classification
- Kingdom: Animalia
- Phylum: Arthropoda
- Clade: Pancrustacea
- Class: Insecta
- Order: Coleoptera
- Suborder: Polyphaga
- Infraorder: Cucujiformia
- Family: Cerambycidae
- Genus: Eunidia
- Species: E. tanzanicola

Binomial name
- Eunidia tanzanicola Téocchi & Sudre, 2003

Species of beetle

Eunidia tanzanicola is a species of beetle in the family Cerambycidae. It was described by Pierre Téocchi and Jérôme Sudre in 2003.
