= Eunidia lineata =

Scientific classification
- Kingdom: Animalia
- Phylum: Arthropoda
- Clade: Pancrustacea
- Class: Insecta
- Order: Coleoptera
- Suborder: Polyphaga
- Infraorder: Cucujiformia
- Family: Cerambycidae
- Genus: Eunidia
- Species: E. lineata

Binomial name
- Eunidia lineata Aurivillius, 1911

Species of beetle

Eunidia lineata is a species of beetle in the family Cerambycidae. It was described by Per Olof Christopher Aurivillius in 1911.
