= Eunidia lerouxi =

Scientific classification
- Kingdom: Animalia
- Phylum: Arthropoda
- Clade: Pancrustacea
- Class: Insecta
- Order: Coleoptera
- Suborder: Polyphaga
- Infraorder: Cucujiformia
- Family: Cerambycidae
- Genus: Eunidia
- Species: E. lerouxi

Binomial name
- Eunidia lerouxi Sudre & Téocchi, 2002

Species of beetle

Eunidia lerouxi is a species of beetle in the family Cerambycidae. It was described by Jérôme Sudre and Pierre Téocchi in 2002.
