= Eunidia subannulicornis =

Scientific classification
- Kingdom: Animalia
- Phylum: Arthropoda
- Clade: Pancrustacea
- Class: Insecta
- Order: Coleoptera
- Suborder: Polyphaga
- Infraorder: Cucujiformia
- Family: Cerambycidae
- Genus: Eunidia
- Species: E. subannulicornis

Binomial name
- Eunidia subannulicornis Breuning, 1968

Synonyms
- Eunidia basinigricornis m. lutea Teocchi & Sudre, 2003

Species of beetle

Eunidia subannulicornis is a species of beetle in the family Cerambycidae. It was described by Stephan von Breuning in 1968.

== Varietas ==
- Eunidia subannulicornis var. basinigricornis Breuning, 1971
- Eunidia subannulicornis var. subsimplicior Breuning, 1972
