= Mirei =

Mirei may refer to any of the following:

== People ==
- Mirei Hayashi (林 美澪; born 2009), Japanese former model and idol
- Mirei Kamada (鎌田 美礼; born 2008), Japanese women's professional shogi player
- Mirei Kiritani (桐谷 美玲; born 1989), Japanese actress, model, and news anchor
- Mirei Sasaki (佐々木 美玲; born 1999), Japanese singer, model, actress, and reporter
- Mirei Shigemori (重森 三玲; 1896–1975), Japanese landscape architect and historian of Japanese gardens
- Mirei Suganami (菅波 美玲; born 2000), Japanese member of ≠Me
- Mirei Tanaka (田中 美麗; born 1996), Japanese past member of Super Girls (Japanese group)
- Mirei Hoshina (星名 美怜; born 1997), Japanese past member of Shiritsu Ebisu Chugaku
- Mirei Yokoyama (横山 みれい; born 1985), Japanese former AV actress
- Mirei Shikishima, a fictional character in Valkyrie Drive- Mermaid

== Animals ==
- Abacetus mirei, a species of ground beetle
- Batrachorhina mirei, a species of beetle
- Calathus mirei, a species of ground beetle
- Cnemolia mirei, a species of beetle
- Dovania mirei, a moth of the family Sphingidae
- Eunidia mirei, a species of beetle
- Eupithecia mirei, a moth in the family Geometridae
- Jordanoleiopus mirei, a species of beetle
- Maublancancylistes mirei, a species of beetle
- Mimostedes mirei, a species of beetle
- Nonyma mirei, a beetle species
- Obereopsis mirei, a species of beetle
- Ocularia mirei, a species of beetle
- Paracorus mirei, a species of beetle
- Planodema mirei, a species of beetle
- Rhabdotis mirei, a dung beetle
- Sophronica mirei, a species of beetle
- Wolterstorffina mirei, a species of toad in the family Bufonidae
