= Theocridini =

Scientific classification
- Kingdom: Animalia
- Phylum: Arthropoda
- Class: Insecta
- Order: Coleoptera
- Suborder: Polyphaga
- Infraorder: Cucujiformia
- Family: Cerambycidae
- Subfamily: Lamiinae
- Tribe: Theocridini; Thomson, 1858

Tribe of beetles

Theocridini is a tribe of longhorn beetles of the subfamily Lamiinae. It was described by Thomson in 1858.

== Taxonomy ==
- Aplanodema Téocchi, 2000
- Cyrtocris Aurivillius, 1903
- Paradocus Breuning, 1950
- Paratheocris Breuning, 1938
- Planodema Thomson, 1860
- Setodocus Breuning, 1968
- Theocris Thomson, 1858
- Trichodocus Breuning, 1939
