= Namibiensis =

Namibiensis may refer to:

- Aloeides namibiensis, species of butterfly
- Diodora namibiensis, species of sea snail
- Gordonia namibiensis, species of bacteria
- Hypotia namibiensis, species of moth
- Lachenalia namibiensis, species of plant
- Otavipithecus namibiensis, species of ape
- Planodema namibiensis, species of beetle
- Schrankia namibiensis, species of moth
- Tarachodes namibiensis, species of praying mantis
- Thiomargarita namibiensis, species of bacteria
