= Paratheocris nigromaculata =

Scientific classification
- Kingdom: Animalia
- Phylum: Arthropoda
- Class: Insecta
- Order: Coleoptera
- Suborder: Polyphaga
- Infraorder: Cucujiformia
- Family: Cerambycidae
- Genus: Paratheocris
- Species: P. nigromaculata

Binomial name
- Paratheocris nigromaculata (Breuning, 1938)

Synonyms
- Theocris nigromaculata Breuning, 1938

Species of beetle

Paratheocris nigromaculata is a species of beetle in the family Cerambycidae. It was described by Stephan von Breuning in 1938, originally under the genus Theocris. It is known from Gabon and the Democratic Republic of the Congo. It contains the varietas Paratheocris nigromaculata var. viridescens.
