= Mimostedes =

Scientific classification
- Kingdom: Animalia
- Phylum: Arthropoda
- Class: Insecta
- Order: Coleoptera
- Suborder: Polyphaga
- Infraorder: Cucujiformia
- Family: Cerambycidae
- Tribe: Desmiphorini
- Genus: Mimostedes

Genus of beetles

Mimostedes is a genus of longhorn beetles of the subfamily Lamiinae, containing the following species:

subgenus Birmanostedes

- Mimostedes birmanus Breuning, 1958

subgenus Mimostedes

- Mimostedes basilewskyi Breuning, 1955
- Mimostedes decellei Breuning, 1968
- Mimostedes fuscosignatus Breuning, 1956
- Mimostedes fuscus Breuning, 1967
- Mimostedes mirei Breuning, 1977
- Mimostedes sudanicus Breuning, 1955
- Mimostedes trivittipennis Breuning, 1956
- Mimostedes ugandicola Breuning, 1955
- Mimostedes vagemaculatus Breuning, 1970

subgenus Nairobostedes

- Mimostedes meneghettii Breuning, 1958

subgenus Punjabostedes

- Mimostedes kashmirensis Breuning, 1957
- Mimostedes punjabensis Breuning, 1957
