= Paratheocris viridis =

Scientific classification
- Kingdom: Animalia
- Phylum: Arthropoda
- Class: Insecta
- Order: Coleoptera
- Suborder: Polyphaga
- Infraorder: Cucujiformia
- Family: Cerambycidae
- Genus: Paratheocris
- Species: P. viridis

Binomial name
- Paratheocris viridis (Aurivillius, 1907)

Synonyms
- Pseudotheocris viridis (Aurivillius) Breuning, 1950; Theocris viridis Aurivillius, 1907

Species of beetle

Paratheocris viridis is a species of beetle in the family Cerambycidae. It was described by Per Olof Christopher Aurivillius in 1907, originally under the genus Theocris. It is known from Cameroon.
