= Paratheocris haltica =

Scientific classification
- Kingdom: Animalia
- Phylum: Arthropoda
- Class: Insecta
- Order: Coleoptera
- Suborder: Polyphaga
- Infraorder: Cucujiformia
- Family: Cerambycidae
- Genus: Paratheocris
- Species: P. haltica

Binomial name
- Paratheocris haltica (Jordan, 1903)

Synonyms
- Theocris haltica Jordan, 1903

Species of beetle

Paratheocris haltica is a species of beetle in the family Cerambycidae. It was described by Karl Jordan in 1903, originally under the genus Theocris. It is known from Gabon.
