= Planodema =

Scientific classification
- Kingdom: Animalia
- Phylum: Arthropoda
- Class: Insecta
- Order: Coleoptera
- Suborder: Polyphaga
- Infraorder: Cucujiformia
- Family: Cerambycidae
- Tribe: Theocridini
- Genus: Planodema; Thomson, 1860

Genus of beetles

Planodema is a genus of longhorn beetles of the subfamily Lamiinae, containing the following species:

- Planodema albopicta (Hintz, 1919)
- Planodema alboreticulata Breuning, 1954
- Planodema albosternalis Breuning, 1950
- Planodema andrei Gilmour, 1956
- Planodema bimaculata (Aurivillius, 1916)
- Planodema bimaculatoides Téocchi & Sudre, 2002
- Planodema cantaloubei Breuning, 1954
- Planodema congoensis (Breuning, 1942)
- Planodema femorata (Gahan, 1890)
- Planodema ferreirai Breuning, 1971
- Planodema ferruginea (Breuning, 1950)
- Planodema flavosparsa (Aurivillius, 1910)
- Planodema flavovittata Breuning, 1947
- Planodema freyi Breuning, 1955
- Planodema granulata (Aurivillius, 1928)
- Planodema griseolineata (Breuning, 1938)
- Planodema leonensis (Breuning, 1936)
- Planodema mirei Lepesme & Breuning, 1955
- Planodema mourgliai Teocchi, 1994
- Planodema multilineata Breuning, 1940
- Planodema namibiensis Adlbauer, 1998
- Planodema nigra (Breuning, 1942)
- Planodema nigrosparsa (Aurivillius, 1914)
- Planodema parascorta Veiga Ferreira, 1971
- Planodema peraffinis Breuning, 1970
- Planodema rufosuturalis Breuning, 1956
- Planodema scorta (Thomson, 1858)
- Planodema senegalensis Breuning, 1972
- Planodema similis Breuning, 1958
- Planodema strandi (Breuning, 1940)
- Planodema unicolor Jordan, 1903
