= Obereopsis aurata =

Scientific classification
- Kingdom: Animalia
- Phylum: Arthropoda
- Class: Insecta
- Order: Coleoptera
- Suborder: Polyphaga
- Infraorder: Cucujiformia
- Family: Cerambycidae
- Genus: Obereopsis
- Species: O. aurata

Binomial name
- Obereopsis aurata Breuning, 1954

Species of beetle

Obereopsis aurata is a species of beetle in the family Cerambycidae. It was described by Stephan von Breuning in 1954.
