= Planodema bimaculata =

Scientific classification
- Kingdom: Animalia
- Phylum: Arthropoda
- Class: Insecta
- Order: Coleoptera
- Suborder: Polyphaga
- Infraorder: Cucujiformia
- Family: Cerambycidae
- Genus: Planodema
- Species: P. bimaculata

Binomial name
- Planodema bimaculata (Aurivillius, 1916)

Synonyms
- Leptodocus bimaculatus Aurivillius, 1916; Planodema bimaculata m. rhomphae Teocchi, 1988; Parapeleconus fuscosignatus Breuning, 1986

Species of beetle

Planodema bimaculata is a species of beetle in the family Cerambycidae. It was described by Per Olof Christopher Aurivillius in 1916, originally under the genus Leptodocus.
