= Cnemolia obliquevittata =

Scientific classification
- Kingdom: Animalia
- Phylum: Arthropoda
- Class: Insecta
- Order: Coleoptera
- Suborder: Polyphaga
- Infraorder: Cucujiformia
- Family: Cerambycidae
- Genus: Cnemolia
- Species: C. obliquevittata

Binomial name
- Cnemolia obliquevittata Breuning, 1978

Species of beetle

Cnemolia obliquevittata is a species of beetle in the family Cerambycidae. It was described by Breuning in 1978. The body is black with fine whitish-grey hairs.
