= Obereopsis obscuritarsis =

Scientific classification
- Kingdom: Animalia
- Phylum: Arthropoda
- Class: Insecta
- Order: Coleoptera
- Suborder: Polyphaga
- Infraorder: Cucujiformia
- Family: Cerambycidae
- Genus: Obereopsis
- Species: O. obscuritarsis

Binomial name
- Obereopsis obscuritarsis Chevrolat, 1855

Synonyms
- Paroberea fuscipes Kolbe, 1893

Species of beetle

Obereopsis obscuritarsis is a species of beetle in the family Cerambycidae. It was described by Louis Alexandre Auguste Chevrolat in 1855. It has a wide distribution in Africa.

== Subspecies ==
- Obereopsis obscuritarsis parangolensis Breuning, 1979
- Obereopsis obscuritarsis similis (Jordan, 1894)
- Obereopsis obscuritarsis obscuritarsis Chevrolat, 1855
- Obereopsis obscuritarsis kenyana Breuning, 1956
- Obereopsis obscuritarsis ugandicola Aurivillius, 1926
