= Paradocus kenyensis =

Scientific classification
- Kingdom: Animalia
- Phylum: Arthropoda
- Class: Insecta
- Order: Coleoptera
- Suborder: Polyphaga
- Infraorder: Cucujiformia
- Family: Cerambycidae
- Genus: Paradocus
- Species: P. kenyensis

Binomial name
- Paradocus kenyensis Téocchi & Sudre, 2002

Species of beetle

Paradocus kenyensis is a species of beetle in the family Cerambycidae. It was described by Pierre Téocchi and Jérôme Sudre in 2002.
