= Obereopsis auriceps =

Scientific classification
- Kingdom: Animalia
- Phylum: Arthropoda
- Class: Insecta
- Order: Coleoptera
- Suborder: Polyphaga
- Infraorder: Cucujiformia
- Family: Cerambycidae
- Genus: Obereopsis
- Species: O. auriceps

Binomial name
- Obereopsis auriceps Lepesme & Breuning, 1953

Species of beetle

Obereopsis auriceps is a species of beetle in the family Cerambycidae. It was described by Lepesme and Stephan von Breuning in 1953.
