= Planodema ferruginea =

Scientific classification
- Kingdom: Animalia
- Phylum: Arthropoda
- Class: Insecta
- Order: Coleoptera
- Suborder: Polyphaga
- Infraorder: Cucujiformia
- Family: Cerambycidae
- Genus: Planodema
- Species: P. ferruginea

Binomial name
- Planodema ferruginea (Breuning, 1950)

Species of beetle

Planodema ferruginea is a species of beetle in the family Cerambycidae. It was described by Stephan von Breuning in 1950.
