= Nonyma glabrifrons =

Scientific classification
- Domain: Eukaryota
- Kingdom: Animalia
- Phylum: Arthropoda
- Class: Insecta
- Order: Coleoptera
- Suborder: Polyphaga
- Infraorder: Cucujiformia
- Family: Cerambycidae
- Genus: Nonyma
- Species: N. glabrifrons

Binomial name
- Nonyma glabrifrons Kolbe, 1894

Synonyms
- Nonyma acutipennis Kolbe, 1893

Species of beetle

Nonyma glabrifrons is a species of beetle in the family Cerambycidae. It was described by Kolbe in 1894.
