= Obereopsis aurosericea =

Scientific classification
- Kingdom: Animalia
- Phylum: Arthropoda
- Class: Insecta
- Order: Coleoptera
- Suborder: Polyphaga
- Infraorder: Cucujiformia
- Family: Cerambycidae
- Genus: Obereopsis
- Species: O. aurosericea

Binomial name
- Obereopsis aurosericea Aurivillius, 1914

Species of beetle

Obereopsis aurosericea is a species of beetle in the family Cerambycidae. It was described by Per Olof Christopher Aurivillius in 1914.
