= Planodema femorata =

Scientific classification
- Kingdom: Animalia
- Phylum: Arthropoda
- Class: Insecta
- Order: Coleoptera
- Suborder: Polyphaga
- Infraorder: Cucujiformia
- Family: Cerambycidae
- Genus: Planodema
- Species: P. femorata

Binomial name
- Planodema femorata (Gahan, 1890)

Synonyms
- Docus femoratus Gahan, 1890

Species of beetle

Planodema femorata is a species of beetle in the family Cerambycidae. It was described by Charles Joseph Gahan in 1890. It is known from Tanzania and Kenya.
