= Obereopsis quadrinotaticollis =

Scientific classification
- Kingdom: Animalia
- Phylum: Arthropoda
- Class: Insecta
- Order: Coleoptera
- Suborder: Polyphaga
- Infraorder: Cucujiformia
- Family: Cerambycidae
- Genus: Obereopsis
- Species: O. quadrinotaticollis

Binomial name
- Obereopsis quadrinotaticollis Breuning, 1949

Species of beetle

Obereopsis quadrinotaticollis is a species of beetle in the family Cerambycidae. It was described by Stephan von Breuning in 1949. It is known from Myanmar.

== Subspecies ==
- Obereopsis quadrinotaticollis quadrinotaticollis Breuning, 1949
- Obereopsis quadrinotaticollis lachungi Breuning, 1982
