= Obereopsis himalayana =

Scientific classification
- Kingdom: Animalia
- Phylum: Arthropoda
- Class: Insecta
- Order: Coleoptera
- Suborder: Polyphaga
- Infraorder: Cucujiformia
- Family: Cerambycidae
- Genus: Obereopsis
- Species: O. himalayana

Binomial name
- Obereopsis himalayana Breuning, 1971

Species of beetle

Obereopsis himalayana is a species of beetle in the family Cerambycidae. It was described by Stephan von Breuning in 1971.

== Subspecies ==
- Obereopsis himalayana himalayana Breuning, 1971
- Obereopsis himalayana bhutanensis Breuning, 1975
