= Paratheocris obliqua =

Scientific classification
- Kingdom: Animalia
- Phylum: Arthropoda
- Class: Insecta
- Order: Coleoptera
- Suborder: Polyphaga
- Infraorder: Cucujiformia
- Family: Cerambycidae
- Genus: Paratheocris
- Species: P. obliqua

Binomial name
- Paratheocris obliqua (Jordan, 1903)

Synonyms
- Theocris obliqua Jordan, 1903

Species of beetle

Paratheocris obliqua is a species of beetle in the family Cerambycidae. It was described by Karl Jordan in 1903. It is known from Gabon.
