= Nonyma allardi =

Scientific classification
- Kingdom: Animalia
- Phylum: Arthropoda
- Class: Insecta
- Order: Coleoptera
- Suborder: Polyphaga
- Infraorder: Cucujiformia
- Family: Cerambycidae
- Genus: Nonyma
- Species: N. allardi

Binomial name
- Nonyma allardi Breuning, 1972

Species of beetle

Nonyma allardi is a species of beetle in the family Cerambycidae. It was described by Stephan von Breuning in 1972.
