= Ocularia grisescens =

Scientific classification
- Kingdom: Animalia
- Phylum: Arthropoda
- Class: Insecta
- Order: Coleoptera
- Suborder: Polyphaga
- Infraorder: Cucujiformia
- Family: Cerambycidae
- Genus: Ocularia
- Species: O. grisescens

Binomial name
- Ocularia grisescens Breuning, 1940

Species of beetle

Ocularia grisescens is a species of beetle in the family Cerambycidae. It was described by Stephan von Breuning in 1940.
