= Paradocus griseovittatus =

Scientific classification
- Kingdom: Animalia
- Phylum: Arthropoda
- Class: Insecta
- Order: Coleoptera
- Suborder: Polyphaga
- Infraorder: Cucujiformia
- Family: Cerambycidae
- Genus: Paradocus
- Species: P. griseovittatus

Binomial name
- Paradocus griseovittatus Breuning, 1940

Species of beetle

Paradocus griseovittatus is a species of beetle in the family Cerambycidae, described by Stephan von Breuning in 1940.
