= Nonyma mediofusca =

Scientific classification
- Kingdom: Animalia
- Phylum: Arthropoda
- Class: Insecta
- Order: Coleoptera
- Suborder: Polyphaga
- Infraorder: Cucujiformia
- Family: Cerambycidae
- Genus: Nonyma
- Species: N. mediofusca

Binomial name
- Nonyma mediofusca Breuning, 1940

Species of beetle

Nonyma mediofusca is a species of beetle in the family Cerambycidae. It was described by Stephan von Breuning in 1940.
