= Planodema granulata =

Scientific classification
- Kingdom: Animalia
- Phylum: Arthropoda
- Class: Insecta
- Order: Coleoptera
- Suborder: Polyphaga
- Infraorder: Cucujiformia
- Family: Cerambycidae
- Genus: Planodema
- Species: P. granulata

Binomial name
- Planodema granulata (Aurivillius, 1928)

Synonyms
- Planodema granulata m. endroedi (Breuning) Teocchi, 1988; Planodema endroedi Breuning, 1981; Docus granulatus Aurivillius, 1928

Species of beetle

Planodema granulata is a species of beetle in the family Cerambycidae. It was described by Per Olof Christopher Aurivillius in 1928. It is known from South Africa, Somalia, and Zimbabwe.
