= Paratheocris lunulata =

Scientific classification
- Kingdom: Animalia
- Phylum: Arthropoda
- Class: Insecta
- Order: Coleoptera
- Suborder: Polyphaga
- Infraorder: Cucujiformia
- Family: Cerambycidae
- Genus: Paratheocris
- Species: P. lunulata

Binomial name
- Paratheocris lunulata (Hintz, 1919)

Synonyms
- Latisternum lunulatum Hintz, 1919

Species of beetle

Paratheocris lunulata is a species of beetle in the family Cerambycidae. It was described by Hintz in 1919, originally under the genus Latisternum. It is known from the Democratic Republic of the Congo.
