= Planodema albosternalis =

Scientific classification
- Kingdom: Animalia
- Phylum: Arthropoda
- Class: Insecta
- Order: Coleoptera
- Suborder: Polyphaga
- Infraorder: Cucujiformia
- Family: Cerambycidae
- Genus: Planodema
- Species: P. albosternalis

Binomial name
- Planodema albosternalis Breuning, 1950

Species of beetle

Planodema albosternalis is a species of beetle in the family Cerambycidae. It was described by Stephan von Breuning in 1950.
