= Obereopsis atricollis =

Scientific classification
- Kingdom: Animalia
- Phylum: Arthropoda
- Class: Insecta
- Order: Coleoptera
- Suborder: Polyphaga
- Infraorder: Cucujiformia
- Family: Cerambycidae
- Genus: Obereopsis
- Species: O. atricollis

Binomial name
- Obereopsis atricollis Breuning, 1957

Species of beetle

Obereopsis atricollis is a species of beetle in the family Cerambycidae. It was described by Stephan von Breuning in 1957.
