= Obereopsis atritarsis =

Scientific classification
- Kingdom: Animalia
- Phylum: Arthropoda
- Class: Insecta
- Order: Coleoptera
- Suborder: Polyphaga
- Infraorder: Cucujiformia
- Family: Cerambycidae
- Genus: Obereopsis
- Species: O. atritarsis

Binomial name
- Obereopsis atritarsis Pic, 1920

Species of beetle

Obereopsis atritarsis is a species of beetle in the family Cerambycidae. It was described by Maurice Pic in 1920.
