= Obereopsis =

Scientific classification
- Kingdom: Animalia
- Phylum: Arthropoda
- Class: Insecta
- Order: Coleoptera
- Suborder: Polyphaga
- Infraorder: Cucujiformia
- Family: Cerambycidae
- Tribe: Saperdini
- Genus: Obereopsis; Chevrolat, 1855

Genus of beetles

Obereopsis is a genus of longhorn beetles of the subfamily Lamiinae, containing the following species:

- Obereopsis angolana Breuning, 1957
- Obereopsis angolensis Breuning, 1958
- Obereopsis angustifrons Breuning, 1957
- Obereopsis annamensis Breuning, 1957
- Obereopsis annulicornis Breuning, 1957
- Obereopsis antenigra Breuning, 1963
- Obereopsis antenigripennis Breuning, 1977
- Obereopsis apicalis Kolbe, 1894
- Obereopsis assimilis Breuning, 1957
- Obereopsis aterrima Breuning, 1949
- Obereopsis atriceps Breuning, 1950
- Obereopsis atricollis Breuning, 1957
- Obereopsis atrifrons Breuning, 1957
- Obereopsis atritarsis Pic, 1920
- Obereopsis atrodiscalis Breuning, 1967
- Obereopsis atrosternalis Breuning, 1956
- Obereopsis aurata Breuning, 1954
- Obereopsis aureotomentosa Breuning, 1950
- Obereopsis auriceps Lepesme & Breuning, 1953
- Obereopsis aurosericea Aurivillius, 1914
- Obereopsis basalis Breuning, 1963
- Obereopsis bicolor Breuning, 1977
- Obereopsis bootangensis Breuning, 1970
- Obereopsis coimbatorana Breuning, 1974
- Obereopsis conradti Breuning, 1957
- Obereopsis endroedii Breuning, 1973
- Obereopsis flaveola Breuning, 1957
- Obereopsis flavipes Hintz, 1919
- Obereopsis himalayana Breuning, 1971
- Obereopsis insignis Aurivillius, 1907
- Obereopsis javanicola Breuning, 1964
- Obereopsis lineaticeps (Pic, 1911)
- Obereopsis longicornis Hintz, 1919
- Obereopsis mabokensis Breuning, 1977
- Obereopsis mausoni Breuning, 1961
- Obereopsis medana Breuning, 1951
- Obereopsis mediofuscovitticollis Breuning, 1977
- Obereopsis minutissima Breuning, 1950
- Obereopsis mirei Breuning, 1977
- Obereopsis mjobergi (Aurivillius, 1925)
- Obereopsis modica (Gahan, 1895)
- Obereopsis monticola Hintz, 1919
- Obereopsis nepalensis Breuning, 1975
- Obereopsis nigronotatipes (Pic, 1940)
- Obereopsis nimbae Lepesme & Breuning, 1952
- Obereopsis obscuritarsis Chevrolat, 1855
- Obereopsis obsoleta Chevrolat, 1858
- Obereopsis paraflaveola Breuning, 1977
- Obereopsis paratogoensis Breuning, 1971
- Obereopsis paratricollis Breuning, 1967
- Obereopsis paravariipes Breuning, 1977
- Obereopsis pseudannulicornis Breuning, 1957
- Obereopsis quadrinotaticollis Breuning, 1949
- Obereopsis sericea Gahan, 1895
- Obereopsis sublongicollis Breuning, 1956
- Obereopsis submodica Breuning, 1974
- Obereopsis subterrubra Breuning, 1950
- Obereopsis sumatrensis Breuning, 1951
- Obereopsis togoensis Breuning, 1961
- Obereopsis trinotaticollis Breuning, 1967
- Obereopsis varieantennalis Breuning, 1982
- Obereopsis variipes Chevrolat, 1858
- Obereopsis verticenigra Breuning, 1957
- Obereopsis walshae (Fisher, 1937)
- Obereopsis wittei Breuning, 1953
