= Nonyma strigata =

Scientific classification
- Domain: Eukaryota
- Kingdom: Animalia
- Phylum: Arthropoda
- Class: Insecta
- Order: Coleoptera
- Suborder: Polyphaga
- Infraorder: Cucujiformia
- Family: Cerambycidae
- Genus: Nonyma
- Species: N. strigata

Binomial name
- Nonyma strigata (Pascoe, 1864)

Synonyms
- Criodule strigata Pascoe, 1864

Species of beetle

Nonyma strigata is a species of beetle in the family Cerambycidae. It was described by Pascoe in 1864.
