= Obereopsis wittei =

Scientific classification
- Kingdom: Animalia
- Phylum: Arthropoda
- Class: Insecta
- Order: Coleoptera
- Suborder: Polyphaga
- Infraorder: Cucujiformia
- Family: Cerambycidae
- Genus: Obereopsis
- Species: O. wittei

Binomial name
- Obereopsis wittei Breuning, 1953

Species of beetle

Obereopsis wittei is a species of beetle in the family Cerambycidae. It was described by Stephan von Breuning in 1953.
