= Ocularia vittata =

Scientific classification
- Kingdom: Animalia
- Phylum: Arthropoda
- Class: Insecta
- Order: Coleoptera
- Suborder: Polyphaga
- Infraorder: Cucujiformia
- Family: Cerambycidae
- Genus: Ocularia
- Species: O. vittata

Binomial name
- Ocularia vittata Aurivillius, 1907

Species of beetle

Ocularia vittata is a species of beetle in the family Cerambycidae. It was described by Per Olof Christopher Aurivillius in 1907.
