= Ocularia vittipennis =

Scientific classification
- Kingdom: Animalia
- Phylum: Arthropoda
- Class: Insecta
- Order: Coleoptera
- Suborder: Polyphaga
- Infraorder: Cucujiformia
- Family: Cerambycidae
- Genus: Ocularia
- Species: O. vittipennis

Binomial name
- Ocularia vittipennis Breuning, 1960

Species of beetle

Ocularia vittipennis is a species of beetle in the family Cerambycidae. It was described by Stephan von Breuning in 1960.
