= Obereopsis walshae =

Scientific classification
- Kingdom: Animalia
- Phylum: Arthropoda
- Clade: Pancrustacea
- Class: Insecta
- Order: Coleoptera
- Suborder: Polyphaga
- Infraorder: Cucujiformia
- Family: Cerambycidae
- Genus: Obereopsis
- Species: O. walshae

Binomial name
- Obereopsis walshae (Fisher, 1937)

Synonyms
- Oberea walshae Fisher, 1937

Species of beetle

Obereopsis walshae is a species of beetle in the family Cerambycidae. It was described by Warren Samuel Fisher in 1937. It is known from Nepal, Laos, Myanmar, Java, Malaysia, and Sumatra.

== Subspecies ==
- Obereopsis walshae walshae (Fisher, 1937)
- Obereopsis walshae infranigra Breuning, 1968
