= Planodema mourgliai =

Scientific classification
- Kingdom: Animalia
- Phylum: Arthropoda
- Class: Insecta
- Order: Coleoptera
- Suborder: Polyphaga
- Infraorder: Cucujiformia
- Family: Cerambycidae
- Genus: Planodema
- Species: P. mourgliai

Binomial name
- Planodema mourgliai Teocchi, 1994

Species of beetle

Planodema mourgliai is a species of beetle in the family Cerambycidae. It was described by Pierre Téocchi in 1994.
