= Obereopsis sumatrensis =

Scientific classification
- Kingdom: Animalia
- Phylum: Arthropoda
- Class: Insecta
- Order: Coleoptera
- Suborder: Polyphaga
- Infraorder: Cucujiformia
- Family: Cerambycidae
- Genus: Obereopsis
- Species: O. sumatrensis

Binomial name
- Obereopsis sumatrensis Breuning, 1951

Species of beetle

Obereopsis sumatrensis is a species of beetle in the family Cerambycidae. It was described by Stephan von Breuning in 1951.

== Subspecies ==
- Obereopsis sumatrensis madrasensis Breuning, 1957
- Obereopsis sumatrensis sumatrensis Breuning, 1951
