= Obereopsis nigronotatipes =

Scientific classification
- Kingdom: Animalia
- Phylum: Arthropoda
- Class: Insecta
- Order: Coleoptera
- Suborder: Polyphaga
- Infraorder: Cucujiformia
- Family: Cerambycidae
- Genus: Obereopsis
- Species: O. nigronotatipes

Binomial name
- Obereopsis nigronotatipes (Pic, 1940)

Species of beetle

Obereopsis nigronotatipes is a species of beetle in the family Cerambycidae. It was described by Maurice Pic in 1940.
