= Nonyma unicolor =

Scientific classification
- Kingdom: Animalia
- Phylum: Arthropoda
- Class: Insecta
- Order: Coleoptera
- Suborder: Polyphaga
- Infraorder: Cucujiformia
- Family: Cerambycidae
- Genus: Nonyma
- Species: N. unicolor

Binomial name
- Nonyma unicolor Breuning, 1961

Species of beetle

Nonyma unicolor is a species of beetle in the family Cerambycidae. It was described by Stephan von Breuning in 1961.
