= Planodema nigra =

Scientific classification
- Kingdom: Animalia
- Phylum: Arthropoda
- Class: Insecta
- Order: Coleoptera
- Suborder: Polyphaga
- Infraorder: Cucujiformia
- Family: Cerambycidae
- Genus: Planodema
- Species: P. nigra

Binomial name
- Planodema nigra (Breuning, 1942)

Species of beetle

Planodema nigra is a species of beetle in the family Cerambycidae. It was described by Stephan von Breuning in 1942.
