= Cnemolia guineensis =

Scientific classification
- Kingdom: Animalia
- Phylum: Arthropoda
- Class: Insecta
- Order: Coleoptera
- Suborder: Polyphaga
- Infraorder: Cucujiformia
- Family: Cerambycidae
- Genus: Cnemolia
- Species: C. guineensis

Binomial name
- Cnemolia guineensis Franz, 1942

Species of beetle

Cnemolia guineensis is a species of beetle in the family Cerambycidae. It was described by Franz in 1942.
