= Ocularia brunnea =

Scientific classification
- Kingdom: Animalia
- Phylum: Arthropoda
- Class: Insecta
- Order: Coleoptera
- Suborder: Polyphaga
- Infraorder: Cucujiformia
- Family: Cerambycidae
- Genus: Ocularia
- Species: O. brunnea

Binomial name
- Ocularia brunnea Jordan, 1894

Species of beetle

Ocularia brunnea is a species of beetle in the family Cerambycidae. It was described by Karl Jordan in 1894.

== Subspecies ==
- Ocularia brunnea brunnea Jordan, 1894
- Ocularia brunnea rufipes Breuning, 1969
