= Obereopsis lineaticeps =

Scientific classification
- Kingdom: Animalia
- Phylum: Arthropoda
- Class: Insecta
- Order: Coleoptera
- Suborder: Polyphaga
- Infraorder: Cucujiformia
- Family: Cerambycidae
- Genus: Obereopsis
- Species: O. lineaticeps

Binomial name
- Obereopsis lineaticeps (Pic, 1911)

Species of beetle

Obereopsis lineaticeps is a species of beetle in the family Cerambycidae. It was described by Maurice Pic in 1911.
