= Planodema griseolineata =

Scientific classification
- Kingdom: Animalia
- Phylum: Arthropoda
- Class: Insecta
- Order: Coleoptera
- Suborder: Polyphaga
- Infraorder: Cucujiformia
- Family: Cerambycidae
- Genus: Planodema
- Species: P. griseolineata

Binomial name
- Planodema griseolineata (Breuning, 1938)

Synonyms
- Striopraonetha hologrisea Breuning, 1986; Docus griseus Breuning, 1942; Docus griseolineatus Breuning, 1938; Planodema griseolineatoides Breuning, 1977; Planodame griseolineata (Breuning) Teocchi, 1991 (misspelling)

Species of beetle

Planodema griseolineata is a species of beetle in the family Cerambycidae. It was described by Stephan von Breuning in 1938, originally under the genus Docus.
