= Ocularia albolineata =

Scientific classification
- Kingdom: Animalia
- Phylum: Arthropoda
- Class: Insecta
- Order: Coleoptera
- Suborder: Polyphaga
- Infraorder: Cucujiformia
- Family: Cerambycidae
- Genus: Ocularia
- Species: O. albolineata

Binomial name
- Ocularia albolineata Villiers, 1942

Synonyms
- Ocularia albolineata m. aureosignata Breuning, 1967

Species of beetle

Ocularia albolineata is a species of beetle in the family Cerambycidae. It was described by Villiers in 1942. It contains the varietas Ocularia albolineata var. pantosi.
