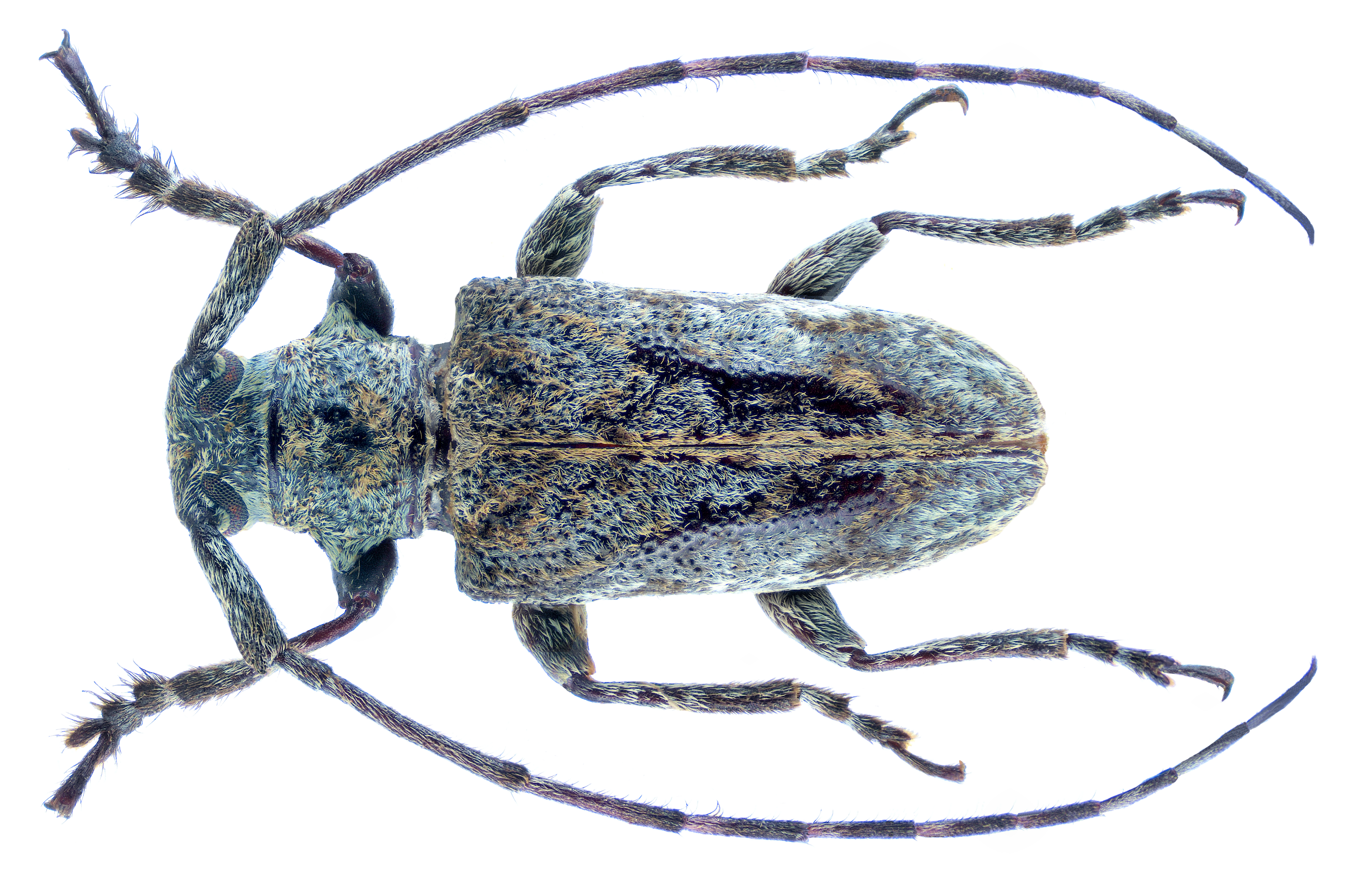
- Cnemolia leonensis

Scientific classification
- Kingdom: Animalia
- Phylum: Arthropoda
- Class: Insecta
- Order: Coleoptera
- Suborder: Polyphaga
- Infraorder: Cucujiformia
- Family: Cerambycidae
- Subfamily: Lamiinae
- Tribe: Ancylonotini
- Genus: Cnemolia; Jordan, 1903

= Cnemolia =

Genus of beetles

Cnemolia is a genus of longhorn beetles of the subfamily Lamiinae.

- Cnemolia albicollis Breuning, 1969
- Cnemolia bertrandi Breuning, 1956
- Cnemolia camerunensis Breuning, 1977
- Cnemolia densenigromaculata Breuning, 1970
- Cnemolia douceti Lepesme & Breuning, 1955
- Cnemolia grisea Breuning, 1952
- Cnemolia guineensis Franz, 1942
- Cnemolia heyrovskyi Breuning, 1938
- Cnemolia ituriensis Breuning, 1972
- Cnemolia jansseni Breuning, 1954
- Cnemolia lateralis Aurivillius, 1907
- Cnemolia leonensis Breuning, 1935
- Cnemolia marmorata Breuning, 1942
- Cnemolia marshalli Breuning, 1935
- Cnemolia mima Jordan, 1903
- Cnemolia mirei Breuning, 1969
- Cnemolia nyassana Breuning, 1935
- Cnemolia obliquevittata Breuning, 1978
- Cnemolia onca (Quedenfeldt, 1882)
- Cnemolia schoutedeni (Breuning, 1935)
- Cnemolia signata Breuning, 1938
- Cnemolia silacea Breuning, 1938
- Cnemolia tubericollis Breuning, 1942
