= Obereopsis endroedii =

Scientific classification
- Kingdom: Animalia
- Phylum: Arthropoda
- Class: Insecta
- Order: Coleoptera
- Suborder: Polyphaga
- Infraorder: Cucujiformia
- Family: Cerambycidae
- Genus: Obereopsis
- Species: O. endroedii

Binomial name
- Obereopsis endroedii Breuning, 1973

Synonyms
- Obereopsis holoflava Breuning, 1955; Obereopsis endroedii Breuning, 1973

Species of beetle

Obereopsis endroedii is a species of beetle in the family Cerambycidae. It was described by Stephan von Breuning in 1973. It is known from the Ivory Coast, the Central African Republic, Cameroon, Guinea, Ghana, and Uganda.
