= Obereopsis sericea =

Scientific classification
- Kingdom: Animalia
- Phylum: Arthropoda
- Class: Insecta
- Order: Coleoptera
- Suborder: Polyphaga
- Infraorder: Cucujiformia
- Family: Cerambycidae
- Genus: Obereopsis
- Species: O. sericea

Binomial name
- Obereopsis sericea Gahan, 1895

Species of beetle

Obereopsis sericea is a species of beetle in the family Cerambycidae. It was described by Charles Joseph Gahan in 1895.
