= Planodema unicolor =

Scientific classification
- Kingdom: Animalia
- Phylum: Arthropoda
- Class: Insecta
- Order: Coleoptera
- Suborder: Polyphaga
- Infraorder: Cucujiformia
- Family: Cerambycidae
- Genus: Planodema
- Species: P. unicolor

Binomial name
- Planodema unicolor Jordan, 1903

Species of beetle

Planodema unicolor is a species of beetle in the family Cerambycidae. It was described by Karl Jordan in 1903.
