= Nonyma egregia =

Scientific classification
- Kingdom: Animalia
- Phylum: Arthropoda
- Class: Insecta
- Order: Coleoptera
- Suborder: Polyphaga
- Infraorder: Cucujiformia
- Family: Cerambycidae
- Genus: Nonyma
- Species: N. egregia

Binomial name
- Nonyma egregia Pascoe, 1864

Synonyms
- Niphoparmena (Parmenohammus) striatopunctata Breuning, 1940

Species of beetle

Nonyma egregia is a species of beetle belonging to the family Cerambycidae. It was described by Pascoe in 1864.
