= Maublancancylistes maublanci =

Scientific classification
- Kingdom: Animalia
- Phylum: Arthropoda
- Class: Insecta
- Order: Coleoptera
- Suborder: Polyphaga
- Infraorder: Cucujiformia
- Family: Cerambycidae
- Genus: Maublancancylistes
- Species: M. maublanci

Binomial name
- Maublancancylistes maublanci Lepesme & Breuning, 1956

Species of beetle

Maublancancylistes maublanci is a species of beetle in the family Cerambycidae. It was described by Lepesme and Breuning in 1956.
