= Planodema ferreirai =

Scientific classification
- Kingdom: Animalia
- Phylum: Arthropoda
- Class: Insecta
- Order: Coleoptera
- Suborder: Polyphaga
- Infraorder: Cucujiformia
- Family: Cerambycidae
- Genus: Planodema
- Species: P. ferreirai

Binomial name
- Planodema ferreirai Breuning, 1971

Species of beetle

Planodema ferreirai is a species of beetle in the family Cerambycidae. It was described by Stephan von Breuning in 1971.
