= Nonyma subinermicollis =

Scientific classification
- Kingdom: Animalia
- Phylum: Arthropoda
- Class: Insecta
- Order: Coleoptera
- Suborder: Polyphaga
- Infraorder: Cucujiformia
- Family: Cerambycidae
- Genus: Nonyma
- Species: N. subinermicollis

Binomial name
- Nonyma subinermicollis Breuning, 1981

Species of beetle

Nonyma subinermicollis is a species of beetle in the family Cerambycidae. It was described by Stephan von Breuning in 1981.
