= Ocularia fasciata =

Scientific classification
- Kingdom: Animalia
- Phylum: Arthropoda
- Class: Insecta
- Order: Coleoptera
- Suborder: Polyphaga
- Infraorder: Cucujiformia
- Family: Cerambycidae
- Genus: Ocularia
- Species: O. fasciata

Binomial name
- Ocularia fasciata Aurivillius, 1907

Species of beetle

Ocularia fasciata is a species of beetle in the family Cerambycidae. It was described by Per Olof Christopher Aurivillius in 1907.
