= Nonyma =

Scientific classification
- Domain: Eukaryota
- Kingdom: Animalia
- Phylum: Arthropoda
- Class: Insecta
- Order: Coleoptera
- Suborder: Polyphaga
- Infraorder: Cucujiformia
- Family: Cerambycidae
- Tribe: Desmiphorini
- Genus: Nonyma

Genus of beetles

Nonyma is a genus of longhorn beetles of the subfamily Lamiinae, containing the following species:

subgenus Myonomoides

- Nonyma allardi Breuning, 1972
- Nonyma grisescens Breuning, 1969
- Nonyma mirei Breuning, 1977
- Nonyma strandiella Breuning, 1940

subgenus Nonyma

- Nonyma apicespinosa Breuning, 1940
- Nonyma bergeri Breuning, 1975
- Nonyma congoensis (Breuning, 1948)
- Nonyma egregia Pascoe, 1864
- Nonyma glabricollis Breuning, 1969
- Nonyma glabrifrons Kolbe, 1894
- Nonyma insularis Báguena & Breuning, 1958
- Nonyma leleupi Breuning, 1956
- Nonyma lepesmei Breuning, 1957
- Nonyma mediofusca Breuning, 1940
- Nonyma nigeriae Breuning, 1978
- Nonyma strigata (Pascoe, 1864)
- Nonyma subinermicollis Breuning, 1981
- Nonyma uluguruensis Breuning, 1975
- Nonyma unicolor Breuning, 1961
- Nonyma variegata Breuning, 1940
