= Planodema flavovittata =

Scientific classification
- Kingdom: Animalia
- Phylum: Arthropoda
- Class: Insecta
- Order: Coleoptera
- Suborder: Polyphaga
- Infraorder: Cucujiformia
- Family: Cerambycidae
- Genus: Planodema
- Species: P. flavovittata

Binomial name
- Planodema flavovittata Breuning, 1947

Synonyms
- Falsostenidea hieckei Breuning, 1966; Cachanus genovillae Lepeme & Breuning, 1955

Species of beetle

Planodema flavovittata is a species of beetle in the family Cerambycidae. It was described by Stephan von Breuning in 1947.

== Subspecies ==
- Planodema flavovittata latevittata Teocchi, 1994
- Planodema flavovittata flavovittata Breuning, 1947
