= Obereopsis insignis =

Scientific classification
- Kingdom: Animalia
- Phylum: Arthropoda
- Class: Insecta
- Order: Coleoptera
- Suborder: Polyphaga
- Infraorder: Cucujiformia
- Family: Cerambycidae
- Genus: Obereopsis
- Species: O. insignis

Binomial name
- Obereopsis insignis Aurivillius, 1907

Species of beetle

Obereopsis insignis is a species of beetle in the family Cerambycidae. It was described by Per Olof Christopher Aurivillius in 1907. It is known from the Ivory Coast, Guinea, and Togo.
