= Mimostedes trivittipennis =

Scientific classification
- Kingdom: Animalia
- Phylum: Arthropoda
- Class: Insecta
- Order: Coleoptera
- Suborder: Polyphaga
- Infraorder: Cucujiformia
- Family: Cerambycidae
- Genus: Mimostedes
- Species: M. trivittipennis

Binomial name
- Mimostedes trivittipennis Breuning, 1956

Synonyms
- Inermoleiopus tanganykae Breuning, 1967

Species of beetle

Mimostedes trivittipennis is a species of beetle in the family Cerambycidae. It was described by Stephan von Breuning in 1956.
