= Obereopsis nepalensis =

Scientific classification
- Kingdom: Animalia
- Phylum: Arthropoda
- Class: Insecta
- Order: Coleoptera
- Suborder: Polyphaga
- Infraorder: Cucujiformia
- Family: Cerambycidae
- Genus: Obereopsis
- Species: O. nepalensis

Binomial name
- Obereopsis nepalensis Breuning, 1975

Species of beetle

Obereopsis nepalensis is a species of beetle in the family Cerambycidae. It was described by Stephan von Breuning in 1975.
