= Nonyma congoensis =

Scientific classification
- Kingdom: Animalia
- Phylum: Arthropoda
- Class: Insecta
- Order: Coleoptera
- Suborder: Polyphaga
- Infraorder: Cucujiformia
- Family: Cerambycidae
- Genus: Nonyma
- Species: N. congoensis

Binomial name
- Nonyma congoensis (Breuning, 1948)

Species of beetle

Nonyma congoensis is a species of beetle in the family Cerambycidae. It was described by Stephan von Breuning in 1948.
