= Paratheocris =

Scientific classification
- Kingdom: Animalia
- Phylum: Arthropoda
- Class: Insecta
- Order: Coleoptera
- Suborder: Polyphaga
- Infraorder: Cucujiformia
- Family: Cerambycidae
- Tribe: Theocridini
- Genus: Paratheocris; Breuning, 1938

Genus of beetles

Paratheocris is a genus of longhorn beetles of the subfamily Lamiinae, containing the following species:

- Paratheocris haltica (Jordan, 1903)
- Paratheocris lunulata (Hintz, 1919)
- Paratheocris mimetica (Aurivillius, 1907)
- Paratheocris nigromaculata (Breuning, 1938)
- Paratheocris obliqua (Jordan, 1903)
- Paratheocris olivacea Breuning, 1938
- Paratheocris similis Breuning, 1938
- Paratheocris viridis (Aurivillius, 1907)
