= Obereopsis atrosternalis =

Scientific classification
- Kingdom: Animalia
- Phylum: Arthropoda
- Class: Insecta
- Order: Coleoptera
- Suborder: Polyphaga
- Infraorder: Cucujiformia
- Family: Cerambycidae
- Genus: Obereopsis
- Species: O. atrosternalis

Binomial name
- Obereopsis atrosternalis Breuning, 1956

Synonyms
- Obereopsis atrosternalis m. flavosternalis Breuning, 1970

Species of beetle

Obereopsis atrosternalis is a species of beetle in the family Cerambycidae. It was described by Stephan von Breuning in 1956. It is known from Nepal and Myanmar.
