= Ocularia flavovittata =

Scientific classification
- Kingdom: Animalia
- Phylum: Arthropoda
- Class: Insecta
- Order: Coleoptera
- Suborder: Polyphaga
- Infraorder: Cucujiformia
- Family: Cerambycidae
- Genus: Ocularia
- Species: O. flavovittata

Binomial name
- Ocularia flavovittata Breuning, 1940

Synonyms
- Ocularia flavovittata m. turei Teocchi, 1997; Ocularia quadrialbovittipennis Breuning, 1958

Species of beetle

Ocularia flavovittata is a species of beetle in the family Cerambycidae. It was described by Stephan von Breuning in 1940.
