= Obereopsis nimbae =

Scientific classification
- Kingdom: Animalia
- Phylum: Arthropoda
- Class: Insecta
- Order: Coleoptera
- Suborder: Polyphaga
- Infraorder: Cucujiformia
- Family: Cerambycidae
- Genus: Obereopsis
- Species: O. nimbae

Binomial name
- Obereopsis nimbae Lepesme & Breuning, 1952

Species of beetle

Obereopsis nimbae is a species of beetle in the family Cerambycidae. It was described by Lepesme and Stephan von Breuning in 1952.
