= Cyrtocris =

Scientific classification
- Kingdom: Animalia
- Phylum: Arthropoda
- Class: Insecta
- Order: Coleoptera
- Suborder: Polyphaga
- Infraorder: Cucujiformia
- Family: Cerambycidae
- Genus: Cyrtocris
- Species: C. fulvicornis

Binomial name
- Cyrtocris fulvicornis Aurivillius, 1904

Genus of beetles

Cyrtocris fulvicornis is a species of beetle in the family Cerambycidae, and the only species in the genus Cyrtocris. It was described by Sven Magnus Aurivillius in 1904. It is known from Lukuledi River in Tanzania.
