= Paradocus maculicollis =

Scientific classification
- Kingdom: Animalia
- Phylum: Arthropoda
- Class: Insecta
- Order: Coleoptera
- Suborder: Polyphaga
- Infraorder: Cucujiformia
- Family: Cerambycidae
- Genus: Paradocus
- Species: P. maculicollis

Binomial name
- Paradocus maculicollis Breuning, 1956

Species of beetle

Paradocus maculicollis is a species of beetle in the family Cerambycidae. It was described by Stephan von Breuning in 1956.
