= Cnemolia grisea =

Scientific classification
- Kingdom: Animalia
- Phylum: Arthropoda
- Class: Insecta
- Order: Coleoptera
- Suborder: Polyphaga
- Infraorder: Cucujiformia
- Family: Cerambycidae
- Genus: Cnemolia
- Species: C. grisea

Binomial name
- Cnemolia grisea Breuning, 1952

Species of beetle

Cnemolia grisea is a species of beetle in the family Cerambycidae. It was described by Breuning in 1952.
