= Planodema scorta =

Scientific classification
- Kingdom: Animalia
- Phylum: Arthropoda
- Class: Insecta
- Order: Coleoptera
- Suborder: Polyphaga
- Infraorder: Cucujiformia
- Family: Cerambycidae
- Genus: Planodema
- Species: P. scorta

Binomial name
- Planodema scorta (Thomson, 1858)

Synonyms
- Domitia scorta Thomson, 1858

Species of beetle

Planodema scorta is a species of beetle in the family Cerambycidae. It was described by James Thomson in 1858, originally under the genus Domitia.
