= Obereopsis aterrima =

Scientific classification
- Kingdom: Animalia
- Phylum: Arthropoda
- Class: Insecta
- Order: Coleoptera
- Suborder: Polyphaga
- Infraorder: Cucujiformia
- Family: Cerambycidae
- Genus: Obereopsis
- Species: O. aterrima

Binomial name
- Obereopsis aterrima Breuning, 1949

Species of beetle

Obereopsis aterrima is a species of beetle in the family Cerambycidae. It was described by Stephan von Breuning in 1949.
