= Trichodocus strandi =

Scientific classification
- Kingdom: Animalia
- Phylum: Arthropoda
- Class: Insecta
- Order: Coleoptera
- Suborder: Polyphaga
- Infraorder: Cucujiformia
- Family: Cerambycidae
- Genus: Trichodocus
- Species: T. strandi

Binomial name
- Trichodocus strandi Breuning, 1940

Species of beetle

Trichodocus strandi is a species of beetle in the family Cerambycidae. It was described by Stephan von Breuning in 1940. It is known from Cameroon. It contains the varietas Trichodocus strandi var. gillieri.
