= Planodema andrei =

Scientific classification
- Kingdom: Animalia
- Phylum: Arthropoda
- Class: Insecta
- Order: Coleoptera
- Suborder: Polyphaga
- Infraorder: Cucujiformia
- Family: Cerambycidae
- Genus: Planodema
- Species: P. andrei

Binomial name
- Planodema andrei Gilmour, 1956

Species of beetle

Planodema andrei is a species of beetle in the family Cerambycidae. It was described by E. Forrest Gilmour in 1956.
