= Nonyma uluguruensis =

Scientific classification
- Kingdom: Animalia
- Phylum: Arthropoda
- Class: Insecta
- Order: Coleoptera
- Suborder: Polyphaga
- Infraorder: Cucujiformia
- Family: Cerambycidae
- Genus: Nonyma
- Species: N. uluguruensis

Binomial name
- Nonyma uluguruensis Breuning, 1975

Synonyms
- Nonyma ulugurensis Breuning, 1975

Species of beetle

Nonyma uluguruensis is a species of beetle in the family Cerambycidae. It was described by Stephan von Breuning in 1975. It is known from Tanzania.
