= Planodema nigrosparsa =

Scientific classification
- Kingdom: Animalia
- Phylum: Arthropoda
- Class: Insecta
- Order: Coleoptera
- Suborder: Polyphaga
- Infraorder: Cucujiformia
- Family: Cerambycidae
- Genus: Planodema
- Species: P. nigrosparsa

Binomial name
- Planodema nigrosparsa (Aurivillius, 1914)

Species of beetle

Planodema nigrosparsa is a species of beetle in the family Cerambycidae. It was described by Per Olof Christopher Aurivillius in 1914.
