= Obereopsis modica =

Scientific classification
- Kingdom: Animalia
- Phylum: Arthropoda
- Class: Insecta
- Order: Coleoptera
- Suborder: Polyphaga
- Infraorder: Cucujiformia
- Family: Cerambycidae
- Genus: Obereopsis
- Species: O. modica

Binomial name
- Obereopsis modica (Gahan, 1895)

Synonyms
- Oberea modica Gahan, 1895; Oberea binhensis Pic, 1926; Oberea diversicornis Pic, 1923; Oberea semisericea Pic, 1923; Oberea pallidicornis Gahan, 1895

Species of beetle

Obereopsis modica is a species of beetle in the family Cerambycidae. It was described by Charles Joseph Gahan in 1895.
