= Ocularia juheli =

Scientific classification
- Kingdom: Animalia
- Phylum: Arthropoda
- Clade: Pancrustacea
- Class: Insecta
- Order: Coleoptera
- Suborder: Polyphaga
- Infraorder: Cucujiformia
- Family: Cerambycidae
- Genus: Ocularia
- Species: O. juheli

Binomial name
- Ocularia juheli Téocchi, Jiroux & Sudre, 2004

Species of beetle

Ocularia juheli is a species of beetle in the family Cerambycidae. It was described by Pierre Téocchi, Eric Jiroux and Jérôme Sudre in 2004.
