= Paratheocris mimetica =

Scientific classification
- Kingdom: Animalia
- Phylum: Arthropoda
- Class: Insecta
- Order: Coleoptera
- Suborder: Polyphaga
- Infraorder: Cucujiformia
- Family: Cerambycidae
- Genus: Paratheocris
- Species: P. mimetica

Binomial name
- Paratheocris mimetica (Aurivillius, 1907)

Synonyms
- Theocris mimetica Aurivillius, 1907

Species of beetle

Paratheocris mimetica is a species of beetle in the family Cerambycidae. It was described by Per Olof Christopher Aurivillius in 1907. It is known from Gabon and Cameroon.
