= Planodema congoensis =

Scientific classification
- Kingdom: Animalia
- Phylum: Arthropoda
- Class: Insecta
- Order: Coleoptera
- Suborder: Polyphaga
- Infraorder: Cucujiformia
- Family: Cerambycidae
- Genus: Planodema
- Species: P. congoensis

Binomial name
- Planodema congoensis (Breuning, 1942)

Species of beetle

Planodema congoensis is a species of beetle in the family Cerambycidae. P. conoensis was described by Stephan von Breuning in 1942. This species lives in Africa (central Africa regions) in the countries of Ivory Coast, Republic of the Congo, Democratic Republic of the Congo, Central African Republic, Ghana, Guinea, Gabon and Cameroon.

== Subspecies ==
The species has two subspecies which are listed below:

- Planodema congoensis gahanensis (Breuning, 1972)
- Planodema congoensis congoensis (Breuning, 1942)
