= Ocularia aurescens =

Scientific classification
- Kingdom: Animalia
- Phylum: Arthropoda
- Class: Insecta
- Order: Coleoptera
- Suborder: Polyphaga
- Infraorder: Cucujiformia
- Family: Cerambycidae
- Genus: Ocularia
- Species: O. aurescens

Binomial name
- Ocularia aurescens Breuning, 1964

Species of beetle

Ocularia aurescens is a species of beetle in the family Cerambycidae. It was described by Stephan von Breuning in 1964.
