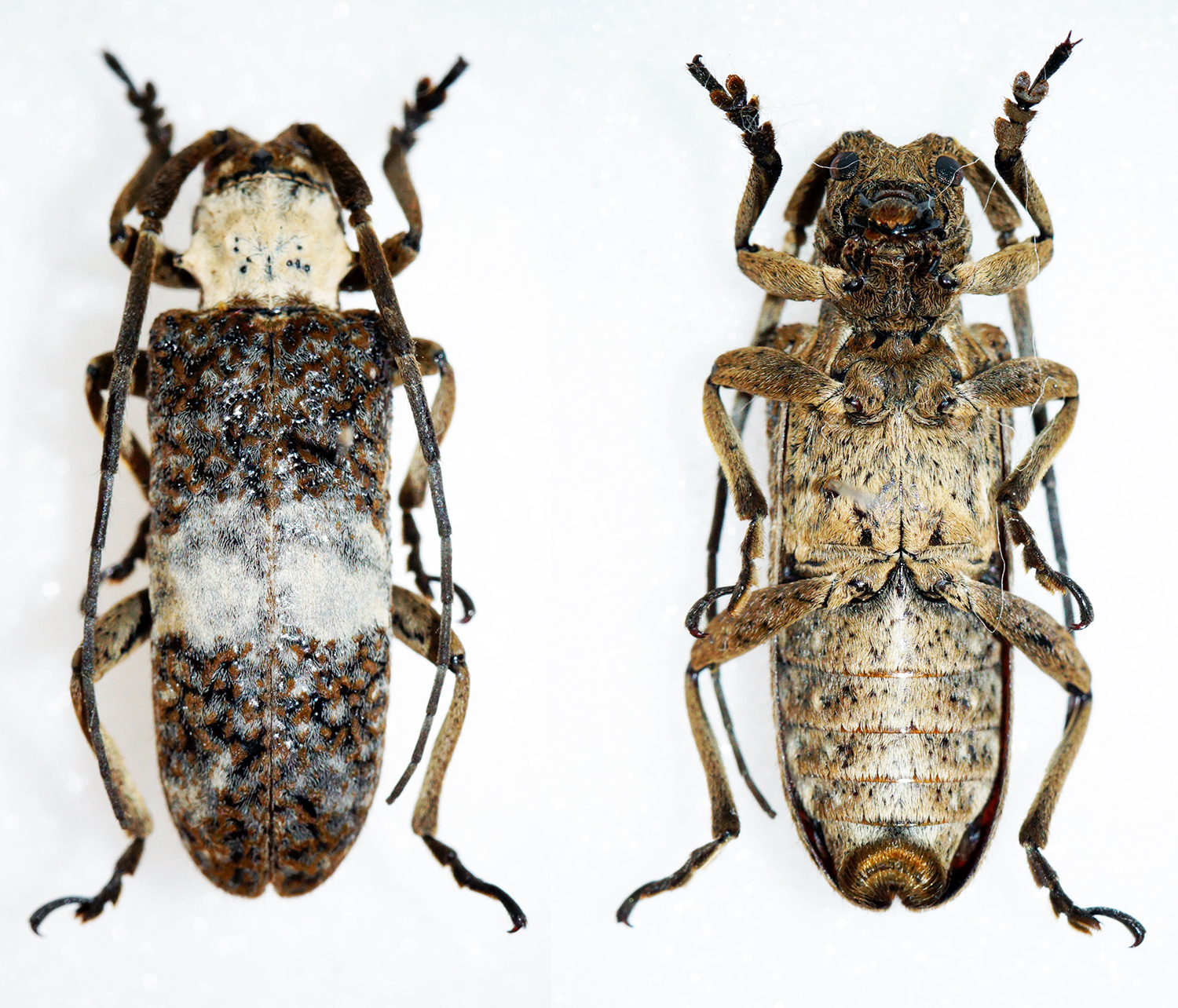

Scientific classification
- Kingdom: Animalia
- Phylum: Arthropoda
- Class: Insecta
- Order: Coleoptera
- Suborder: Polyphaga
- Infraorder: Cucujiformia
- Family: Cerambycidae
- Genus: Paradocus
- Species: P. albithorax

Binomial name
- Paradocus albithorax (Breuning, 1938)

Synonyms
- Paradocus paralbithorax Breuning, 1986; Hoplocris albithorax Breuning, 1938

= Paradocus albithorax =

Species of beetle

Paradocus albithorax is a species of beetle in the family Cerambycidae. It was described by Stephan von Breuning in 1938, originally under the genus Hoplocris.
