= Obereopsis longicornis =

Scientific classification
- Kingdom: Animalia
- Phylum: Arthropoda
- Class: Insecta
- Order: Coleoptera
- Suborder: Polyphaga
- Infraorder: Cucujiformia
- Family: Cerambycidae
- Genus: Obereopsis
- Species: O. longicornis

Binomial name
- Obereopsis longicornis Hintz, 1919

Species of beetle

Obereopsis longicornis is a species of beetle in the family Cerambycidae. It was described by Hintz in 1919.

== Subspecies ==
- Obereopsis longicornis rufuliantennata Breuning, 1968
- Obereopsis longicornis longicornis Hintz, 1919
