= Trichodocus =

Scientific classification
- Kingdom: Animalia
- Phylum: Arthropoda
- Class: Insecta
- Order: Coleoptera
- Suborder: Polyphaga
- Infraorder: Cucujiformia
- Family: Cerambycidae
- Tribe: Theocridini
- Genus: Trichodocus

Genus of beetles

Trichodocus is a genus of longhorn beetles of the subfamily Lamiinae, containing the following species:

- Trichodocus albosticticus Breuning, 1967
- Trichodocus rufus Breuning, 1939
- Trichodocus strandi Breuning, 1940
