= Obereopsis obsoleta =

Scientific classification
- Kingdom: Animalia
- Phylum: Arthropoda
- Class: Insecta
- Order: Coleoptera
- Suborder: Polyphaga
- Infraorder: Cucujiformia
- Family: Cerambycidae
- Genus: Obereopsis
- Species: O. obsoleta

Binomial name
- Obereopsis obsoleta Chevrolat, 1858

Synonyms
- Obereopsis obsoleta m. partebrunneicollis Breuning, 1968

Species of beetle

Obereopsis obsoleta is a species of beetle in the family Cerambycidae. It was described by Chevrolat in 1858. It is known from the Ivory Coast, Gabon, Angola, Ghana, the Democratic Republic of the Congo, and Togo.

== Varietas ==
- Obereopsis obsoleta var. fuscoampliata Breuning, 1950
- Obereopsis obsoleta var. fusciceps Breuning, 1957
