= Cnemolia onca =

Scientific classification
- Kingdom: Animalia
- Phylum: Arthropoda
- Class: Insecta
- Order: Coleoptera
- Suborder: Polyphaga
- Infraorder: Cucujiformia
- Family: Cerambycidae
- Genus: Cnemolia
- Species: C. onca

Binomial name
- Cnemolia onca (Quedenfeldt, 1882)

Species of beetle

Cnemolia onca is a species of beetle in the family Cerambycidae. It was described by Quedenfeldt in 1882.
