= Ocularia undulatovittata =

Scientific classification
- Kingdom: Animalia
- Phylum: Arthropoda
- Class: Insecta
- Order: Coleoptera
- Suborder: Polyphaga
- Infraorder: Cucujiformia
- Family: Cerambycidae
- Genus: Ocularia
- Species: O. undulatovittata

Binomial name
- Ocularia undulatovittata Breuning, 1967

Species of beetle

Ocularia undulatovittata is a species of beetle in the family Cerambycidae. It was described by Stephan von Breuning in 1967. It is known from Democratic Republic of the Congo.
