= Ocularia grisea =

Scientific classification
- Kingdom: Animalia
- Phylum: Arthropoda
- Class: Insecta
- Order: Coleoptera
- Suborder: Polyphaga
- Infraorder: Cucujiformia
- Family: Cerambycidae
- Genus: Ocularia
- Species: O. grisea

Binomial name
- Ocularia grisea Breuning, 1958

Synonyms
- Ocularia undulatoides Breuning, 1974

Species of beetle

Ocularia grisea is a species of beetle in the family Cerambycidae. It was described by Stephan von Breuning in 1958. It is known from the Ivory Coast and the Democratic Republic of the Congo.
