= Obereopsis apicalis =

Scientific classification
- Kingdom: Animalia
- Phylum: Arthropoda
- Class: Insecta
- Order: Coleoptera
- Suborder: Polyphaga
- Infraorder: Cucujiformia
- Family: Cerambycidae
- Genus: Obereopsis
- Species: O. apicalis

Binomial name
- Obereopsis apicalis Kolbe, 1894

Species of beetle

Obereopsis apicalis is a species of beetle in the family Cerambycidae. It was described by Hermann Julius Kolbe in 1894.
