= Nonyma insularis =

Scientific classification
- Kingdom: Animalia
- Phylum: Arthropoda
- Class: Insecta
- Order: Coleoptera
- Suborder: Polyphaga
- Infraorder: Cucujiformia
- Family: Cerambycidae
- Genus: Nonyma
- Species: N. insularis

Binomial name
- Nonyma insularis Báguena & Breuning, 1958

Species of beetle

Nonyma insularis is a species of beetle in the family Cerambycidae. It was described by Báguena and Breuning in 1958.
