= Obereopsis conradti =

Scientific classification
- Kingdom: Animalia
- Phylum: Arthropoda
- Class: Insecta
- Order: Coleoptera
- Suborder: Polyphaga
- Infraorder: Cucujiformia
- Family: Cerambycidae
- Genus: Obereopsis
- Species: O. conradti

Binomial name
- Obereopsis conradti Breuning, 1957

Species of beetle

Obereopsis conradti is a species of beetle in the family Cerambycidae. It was described by Stephan von Breuning in 1957.

== Subspecies ==
- Obereopsis conradti fuscoantennalis Breuning, 1977
- Obereopsis conradti conradti Breuning, 1957
