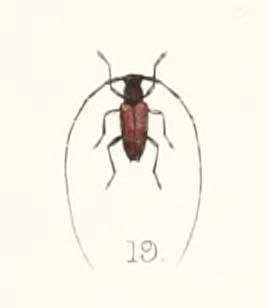

Scientific classification
- Kingdom: Animalia
- Phylum: Arthropoda
- Class: Insecta
- Order: Coleoptera
- Suborder: Polyphaga
- Infraorder: Cucujiformia
- Family: Cerambycidae
- Genus: Ocularia
- Species: O. apicalis

Binomial name
- Ocularia apicalis Jordan, 1894

Synonyms
- Ocularia apicalis m. totoflava Teocchi, 2000

= Ocularia apicalis =

Species of beetle

Ocularia apicalis is a species of beetle in the family Cerambycidae. It was described by Karl Jordan in 1894.
