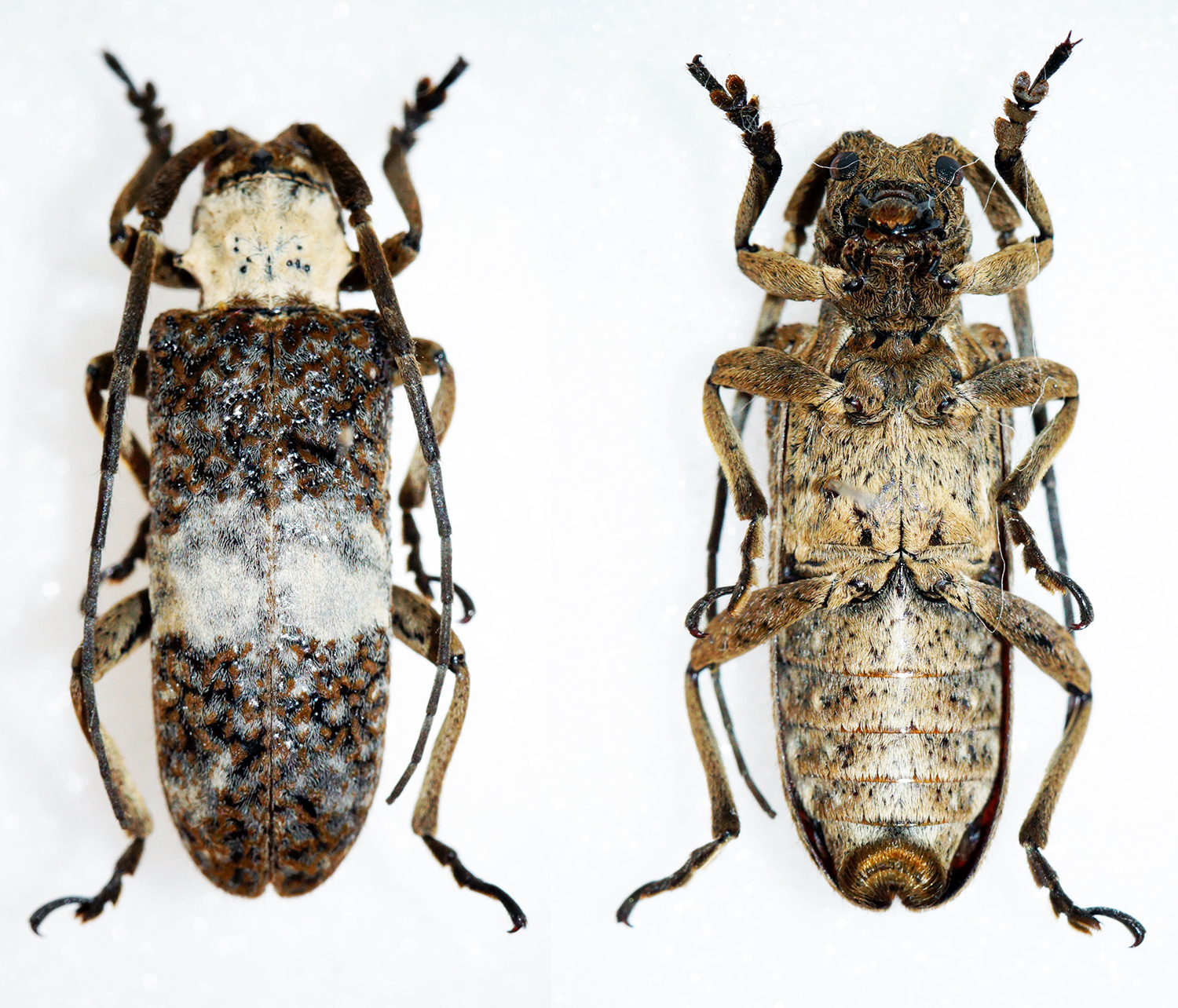

Scientific classification
- Kingdom: Animalia
- Phylum: Arthropoda
- Class: Insecta
- Order: Coleoptera
- Suborder: Polyphaga
- Infraorder: Cucujiformia
- Family: Cerambycidae
- Tribe: Theocridini
- Genus: Paradocus; Breuning, 1956

= Paradocus =

Genus of beetles

Paradocus is a genus of longhorn beetles of the subfamily Lamiinae, containing the following species:

- Paradocus albithorax (Breuning, 1938)
- Paradocus albovittatus Breuning, 1938
- Paradocus griseovittatus Breuning, 1940
- Paradocus kenyensis Téocchi & Sudre, 2002
- Paradocus maculicollis Breuning, 1956
- Paradocus multifasciculatus Breuning, 1961
