= Planodema albopicta =

Scientific classification
- Kingdom: Animalia
- Phylum: Arthropoda
- Class: Insecta
- Order: Coleoptera
- Suborder: Polyphaga
- Infraorder: Cucujiformia
- Family: Cerambycidae
- Genus: Planodema
- Species: P. albopicta

Binomial name
- Planodema albopicta (Hintz, 1919)

Species of beetle

Planodema albopicta is a species of beetle in the family Cerambycidae. It was described by Hintz in 1919.
