= Ocularia undulatofasciata =

Scientific classification
- Kingdom: Animalia
- Phylum: Arthropoda
- Class: Insecta
- Order: Coleoptera
- Suborder: Polyphaga
- Infraorder: Cucujiformia
- Family: Cerambycidae
- Genus: Ocularia
- Species: O. undulatofasciata

Binomial name
- Ocularia undulatofasciata Lepesme & Breuning, 1955

Species of beetle

Ocularia undulatofasciata is a species of beetle in the family Cerambycidae. It was described by Lepesme and Stephan von Breuning in 1955.

== Subspecies ==
- Ocularia undulatofasciata legrandi Téocchi, Jiroux & Sudre, 2004
- Ocularia undulatofasciata undulatofasciata Lepesme & Breuning, 1952
