= Cnemolia heyrovskyi =

Scientific classification
- Kingdom: Animalia
- Phylum: Arthropoda
- Class: Insecta
- Order: Coleoptera
- Suborder: Polyphaga
- Infraorder: Cucujiformia
- Family: Cerambycidae
- Genus: Cnemolia
- Species: C. heyrovskyi

Binomial name
- Cnemolia heyrovskyi Breuning, 1938

Species of beetle

Cnemolia heyrovskyi is a species of beetle in the family Cerambycidae. It was described by Stephan von Breuning (entomologist) in 1938.
