= Trichodocus albosticticus =

Scientific classification
- Kingdom: Animalia
- Phylum: Arthropoda
- Class: Insecta
- Order: Coleoptera
- Suborder: Polyphaga
- Infraorder: Cucujiformia
- Family: Cerambycidae
- Genus: Trichodocus
- Species: T. albosticticus

Binomial name
- Trichodocus albosticticus Breuning, 1967

Species of beetle

Trichodocus albosticticus is a species of beetle in the family Cerambycidae. It was described by Stephan von Breuning in 1967.
