= Ocularia cineracea =

Scientific classification
- Kingdom: Animalia
- Phylum: Arthropoda
- Class: Insecta
- Order: Coleoptera
- Suborder: Polyphaga
- Infraorder: Cucujiformia
- Family: Cerambycidae
- Genus: Ocularia
- Species: O. cineracea

Binomial name
- Ocularia cineracea Jordan, 1894

Species of beetle

Ocularia cineracea is a species of beetle in the family Cerambycidae. It was described by Karl Jordan in 1894.

== Subspecies ==
- Ocularia cineracea aethiopica Teocchi, Jiroux & Sudre, 2004
- Ocularia cineracea cineracea Jordan, 1894
- Ocularia cineracea subcineracea Breuning, 1968
