= Obereopsis flavipes =

Scientific classification
- Kingdom: Animalia
- Phylum: Arthropoda
- Class: Insecta
- Order: Coleoptera
- Suborder: Polyphaga
- Infraorder: Cucujiformia
- Family: Cerambycidae
- Genus: Obereopsis
- Species: O. flavipes

Binomial name
- Obereopsis flavipes Hintz, 1919

Species of beetle

Obereopsis flavipes is a species of beetle in the family Cerambycidae. It was described by Hintz in 1919.
