= Nonyma nigeriae =

Scientific classification
- Kingdom: Animalia
- Phylum: Arthropoda
- Class: Insecta
- Order: Coleoptera
- Suborder: Polyphaga
- Infraorder: Cucujiformia
- Family: Cerambycidae
- Genus: Nonyma
- Species: N. nigeriae

Binomial name
- Nonyma nigeriae Breuning, 1978

Species of beetle

Nonyma nigeriae is a species of beetle in the family Cerambycidae. It was described by Stephan von Breuning in 1978.
