= Planodema senegalensis =

Scientific classification
- Kingdom: Animalia
- Phylum: Arthropoda
- Class: Insecta
- Order: Coleoptera
- Suborder: Polyphaga
- Infraorder: Cucujiformia
- Family: Cerambycidae
- Genus: Planodema
- Species: P. senegalensis

Binomial name
- Planodema senegalensis Breuning, 1972

Species of beetle

Planodema senegalensis is a species of beetle in the family Cerambycidae. It was described by Stephan von Breuning in 1972.
