= Mimostedes basilewskyi =

Scientific classification
- Kingdom: Animalia
- Phylum: Arthropoda
- Class: Insecta
- Order: Coleoptera
- Suborder: Polyphaga
- Infraorder: Cucujiformia
- Family: Cerambycidae
- Genus: Mimostedes
- Species: M. basilewskyi

Binomial name
- Mimostedes basilewskyi Breuning, 1955

Species of beetle

Mimostedes basilewskyi is a species of beetle in the family Cerambycidae. It was described by Stephan von Breuning in 1955.
