= Obereopsis flaveola =

Scientific classification
- Kingdom: Animalia
- Phylum: Arthropoda
- Class: Insecta
- Order: Coleoptera
- Suborder: Polyphaga
- Infraorder: Cucujiformia
- Family: Cerambycidae
- Genus: Obereopsis
- Species: O. flaveola

Binomial name
- Obereopsis flaveola Breuning, 1957

Species of beetle

Obereopsis flaveola is a species of beetle in the family Cerambycidae. It was described by Stephan von Breuning in 1957.
