= Obereopsis variipes =

Scientific classification
- Kingdom: Animalia
- Phylum: Arthropoda
- Class: Insecta
- Order: Coleoptera
- Suborder: Polyphaga
- Infraorder: Cucujiformia
- Family: Cerambycidae
- Genus: Obereopsis
- Species: O. variipes

Binomial name
- Obereopsis variipes Chevrolat, 1858

Synonyms
- Paraoberea lepta Kolbe, 1894; Obereopsis variipes m. fuscosuturalis Breuning, 1962; Obereopsis variipes m. leptoides Breuning, 1978; Obereopsis adusta Hintz, 1919

Species of beetle

Obereopsis variipes is a species of beetle in the family Cerambycidae. It was described by Louis Alexandre Auguste Chevrolat in 1858. It has a wide distribution in Africa.

== Subspecies ==
- Obereopsis variipes variipes Chevrolat, 1858
- Obereopsis variipes snizeki Téocchi, 1999
