= Cnemolia jansseni =

Scientific classification
- Kingdom: Animalia
- Phylum: Arthropoda
- Class: Insecta
- Order: Coleoptera
- Suborder: Polyphaga
- Infraorder: Cucujiformia
- Family: Cerambycidae
- Genus: Cnemolia
- Species: C. jansseni

Binomial name
- Cnemolia jansseni Breuning, 1954

Species of beetle

Cnemolia jansseni is a species of beetle in the family Cerambycidae. It was described by Breuning in 1954.
