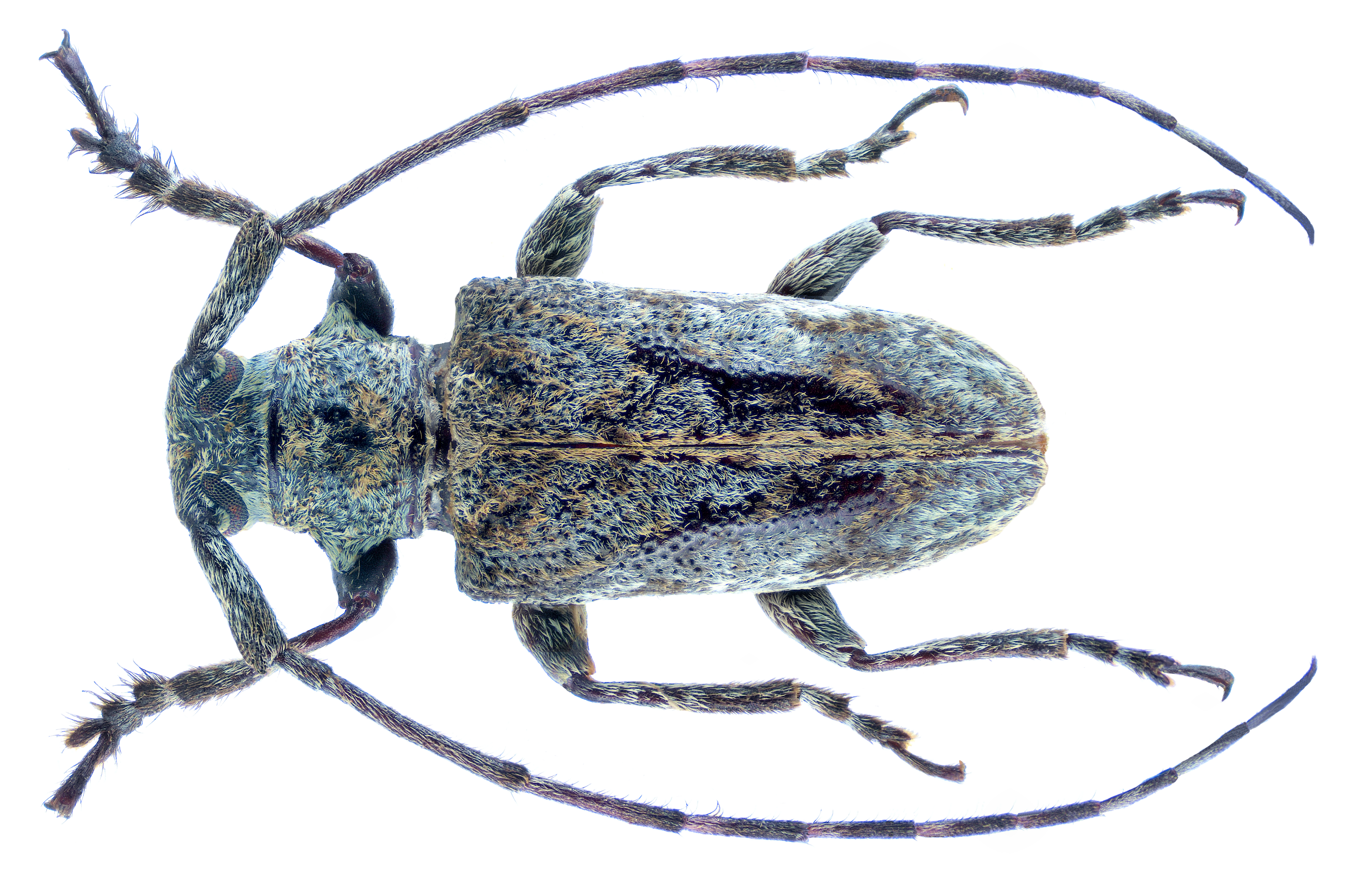

Scientific classification
- Kingdom: Animalia
- Phylum: Arthropoda
- Class: Insecta
- Order: Coleoptera
- Suborder: Polyphaga
- Infraorder: Cucujiformia
- Family: Cerambycidae
- Genus: Cnemolia
- Species: C. leonensis

Binomial name
- Cnemolia leonensis Breuning, 1935

= Cnemolia leonensis =

Species of beetle

Cnemolia leonensis is a species of beetle in the family Cerambycidae. It was described by Breuning in 1935.
