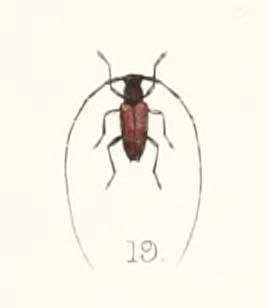
- Ocularia apicalis

Scientific classification
- Kingdom: Animalia
- Phylum: Arthropoda
- Class: Insecta
- Order: Coleoptera
- Suborder: Polyphaga
- Infraorder: Cucujiformia
- Family: Cerambycidae
- Subfamily: Lamiinae
- Tribe: Oculariini; Jordan, 1894
- Genus: Ocularia; Jordan, 1894

= Ocularia =

Genus of beetles

Oculariini is a tribe of longhorn beetles of the subfamily Lamiinae. It was described by Karl Jordan in 1894. It contains a single genus, Ocularia.

subgenus Jossocularia

- Ocularia abyssinica Téocchi, Jiroux & Sudre, Jiroux & Sudre, 2004
- Ocularia undulatofasciata Lepesme & Breuning, 1952

subgenus Ocularia

- Ocularia albolineata Villiers, 1942
- Ocularia anterufa Breuning, 1964
- Ocularia apicalis Jordan, 1894
- Ocularia ashantica Breuning, 1950
- Ocularia aurescens Breuning, 1964
- Ocularia brunnea Jordan, 1894
- Ocularia cineracea Jordan, 1894
- Ocularia collarti Breuning, 1950
- Ocularia decellei Breuning, 1968
- Ocularia fasciata Aurivillius, 1907
- Ocularia flavovittata Breuning, 1940
- Ocularia grisea Breuning, 1958
- Ocularia grisescens Breuning, 1940
- Ocularia insularis Breuning, 1960
- Ocularia juheli Téocchi, Jiroux & Sudre, 2004
- Ocularia kaszabi Breuning, 1972
- Ocularia marmorata Breuning, 1950
- Ocularia mirei Breuning, 1977
- Ocularia nigrobasalis Breuning, 1950
- Ocularia pantosi Breuning, 1957
- Ocularia pointeli Lepesme & Breuning, 1955
- Ocularia protati Lepesme & Breuning, 1955
- Ocularia quadroalbovittipennis Breuning, 1960
- Ocularia quentini Breuning, 1960
- Ocularia rotundipennis Breuning, 1950
- Ocularia subashantica Breuning, 1956
- Ocularia subcineracea Breuning, 1968
- Ocularia transversefasciata Breuning, 1940
- Ocularia undulatovittata Breuning, 1967
- Ocularia vittata Aurivillius, 1907
- Ocularia vittipennis Breuning, 1960
