= Cnemolia douceti =

Scientific classification
- Kingdom: Animalia
- Phylum: Arthropoda
- Class: Insecta
- Order: Coleoptera
- Suborder: Polyphaga
- Infraorder: Cucujiformia
- Family: Cerambycidae
- Genus: Cnemolia
- Species: C. douceti

Binomial name
- Cnemolia douceti Lepesme & Breuning, 1955

Species of beetle

Cnemolia douceti is a species of beetle in the family Cerambycidae. It was described by Lepesme and Breuning in 1955.

It can be found on the Ivory Coast.
