= Eupithecia mirei =

Scientific classification
- Domain: Eukaryota
- Kingdom: Animalia
- Phylum: Arthropoda
- Class: Insecta
- Order: Lepidoptera
- Family: Geometridae
- Genus: Eupithecia
- Species: E. mirei

Binomial name
- Eupithecia mirei Herbulot, 1965

Species of moth

Eupithecia mirei is a moth in the family Geometridae. It is found in the Tibesti Region in Chad.
