= Pararhopaloscelides =

Scientific classification
- Kingdom: Animalia
- Phylum: Arthropoda
- Class: Insecta
- Order: Coleoptera
- Suborder: Polyphaga
- Infraorder: Cucujiformia
- Family: Cerambycidae
- Genus: Pararhopaloscelides
- Species: P. sericeipennis

Binomial name
- Pararhopaloscelides sericeipennis Breuning, 1947

Genus of beetles

Pararhopaloscelides is a genus of beetles in the family Cerambycidae, which contains the single species Pararhopaloscelides sericeipennis. It was described by Breuning in 1947.
