= Abacetus mirei =

Scientific classification
- Domain: Eukaryota
- Kingdom: Animalia
- Phylum: Arthropoda
- Class: Insecta
- Order: Coleoptera
- Suborder: Adephaga
- Family: Carabidae
- Genus: Abacetus
- Species: A. mirei

Binomial name
- Abacetus mirei Straneo, 1964

Species of beetle

Abacetus mirei is a species of ground beetle in the subfamily Pterostichinae. It was described by Straneo in 1964.
