= Sven Magnus Aurivillius =

Swedish zoologist

Sven Magnus Aurivillius (12 August 1892 in Stockholm – 4 March 1928 in Mörby), was a Swedish zoologist.

He was the director of the centre for marine zoology in Kristineberg in 1923, but left prematurely, just before the publishing of his thesis on Japanese sea fans. He was the eighth generation of his family to be a doctor at the University of Uppsala. His father was the entomologist Per Olof Christopher Aurivillius (1853–1928), and his uncle was the zoologist Carl Wilhelm Samuel Aurivillius (1854–1899).
