= Mirei Hayashi =

- 林 美澪
- Born: March 10, 2009 (age 17); Aichi Prefecture, Japan
- Occupations: Model (former); idol (former)
- Years active: 2019–2025
- Agent: Zest Inc.
- Height: 158 cm (5 ft 2 in)
- Musical career
- Genre: J-pop
- Instrument: Vocals
- Years active: 2019–2024
- Formerly of: SKE48

Mirei Hayashi (林 美澪, Hayashi Mirei; born March 10, 2009 in Aichi Prefecture) is a Japanese former model and idol. She is a former member of SKE48. She joined SKE48 as a tenth-generation trainee in November 2019, before being promoted to Team E. She was a member of SKE48 Team E and exclusive model for Seventeen magazine.

== Early life ==
Hayashi was born on March 10, 2009, in Aichi Prefecture. Her entertainment career began in 2019 when she successfully auditioned for the tenth generation of the idol group SKE48. Hayashi and her fellow tenth generation members performed their first full live concert in February 2020.

== Career ==
Hayashi passed SKE48's 10th generation auditions. Her debut was on November 19, 2019. Her stage debut was on December 22, 2019.

On November 23, 2020, Hayashi's first selection for SKE48's main performance group came, when she was selected for SKE48's 27th single "Koiochi Flag", released on February 3, 2021. She has since been selected for the main performance groups for several more of the group's singles, Hayashi served as the choreographic center for SKE48's 28th single "Ano Koro no Kimi wo Mitsuketa", released on September 1, 2021.

On December 19, 2021, during SKE48 New Generation Concert 2021, she was promoted to Team E.

Hayashi became an exclusive model for the fashion magazine Seventeen on February 22, 2022. She is the first SKE48 member to become a Seventeen exclusive model. She served as the center again for SKE48's 29th single "Kokoro ni Flower", released on March 9, 2022, and She had her first solo song "Watashi no Tokei" as a coupling track on SKE48's 30th single "Zettai Inspiration", released on October 5, 2022.

On May 7, 2024, she announced her graduation from SKE48. She graduated on August 31 that year. Her graduation performance, which was slated for that day, was postponed to September 15 due to Typhoon Shanshan.

She graduated from Seventeen by the end of February 2025 and left Zest Inc. by the end of March that year. She is currently in a hiatus from entertainment activities and focusing on her school activities.

On September 14, 2026, Hayashi was revealed as a new member candidate for the girl group ≠Me, alongside several other former AKB48 Group members.

== Discography ==
=== SKE48 ===
==== Singles ====
Year	No.	Title	Role	Notes
2020	26	"Sōyūtoko Aru yo ne?"	B-side	Sang on "Nagisa no Image" as SKE48 10th Generation.
2021	27	"Koiochi Flag"	A-side	First SKE48 A-side. Also sang on "Change Your World" as Black Pearl.
2021	28	"Ano Koro no Kimi wo Mitsuketa"	A-side, Center	First solo center. Also sang on "Aozora Kataomoi" (2021 Ver.)
2022	29	"Kokoro ni Flower"	A-side, Center	
2022	30	"Zettai Inspiration"	A-side	Also sang on "Watashi no Tokei" which is her solo song.
2023	31	"Suki ni Nacchatta"	A-side	Also sang on "Katariaukoto kara Hajimeyou" as Team E.
2024	32	"Ai no Hologram"	A-side	Also sang on "Kishibe no Shōjo yo" as Team E.

==== Stage Units ====
Team E 5th Stage "SKE Festival"

1. "1994-nen no Raimei"

SKE48 Kenkyuusei Stage "We're Growing Up"

1. "Koko de Ippatsu"

Team E 6th Stage "Koedashite iko ze!!!"

1. "Hoshi no Shizuku" (Solo)

== Appearances ==
=== TV drama ===
- "10th Anniversary Nagoya Iki Saishū Ressha 2022" (10th Anniversary 名古屋行き最終列車2022) - 3rd Episode (2022)

=== Stage ===
- "Stage Bling Bling by Seventeen" (舞台 Bling Bling by Seventeen) (2022)

=== Runway ===
- GirlsAward
  - 2022 Spring/Summer (May 14, 2022 at Makuhari Messe)
  - 2022 Autumn/Winter (October 8, 2022 at Makuhari Messe)

=== Event ===
- "Seventeen Summer School Festival" (Seventeen 夏の学園祭)
  - "Seventeen Summer School Festival 2023" (August 23, 2023 at Tokyo Dome City Prism Hall)

== Bibliography ==
=== Magazines ===
- Seventeen (March 1, 2022 – present - SHUEISHA Inc.) - Exclusive model
