= Setodocus =

Scientific classification
- Kingdom: Animalia
- Phylum: Arthropoda
- Class: Insecta
- Order: Coleoptera
- Suborder: Polyphaga
- Infraorder: Cucujiformia
- Family: Cerambycidae
- Genus: Setodocus
- Species: S. albopunctatus

Binomial name
- Setodocus albopunctatus Breuning, 1968

Genus of beetles

Setodocus albopunctatus is a species of beetle in the family Cerambycidae, and the only species in the genus Setodocus. It was described by Stephan von Breuning in 1968.
