= Planodema mirei =

Scientific classification
- Kingdom: Animalia
- Phylum: Arthropoda
- Class: Insecta
- Order: Coleoptera
- Suborder: Polyphaga
- Infraorder: Cucujiformia
- Family: Cerambycidae
- Genus: Planodema
- Species: P. mirei

Binomial name
- Planodema mirei Lepesme & Breuning, 1955

Species of beetle

Planodema mirei is a species of beetle in the family Cerambycidae. It was described by Lepesme and Stephan von Breuning in 1955.
