= Planodema namibiensis =

Scientific classification
- Kingdom: Animalia
- Phylum: Arthropoda
- Class: Insecta
- Order: Coleoptera
- Suborder: Polyphaga
- Infraorder: Cucujiformia
- Family: Cerambycidae
- Genus: Planodema
- Species: P. namibiensis

Binomial name
- Planodema namibiensis Adlbauer, 1998

Species of beetle

Planodema namibiensis is a species of beetle in the family Cerambycidae. It was described by Adlbauer in 1998. It is known from Namibia.
