= Aplanodema =

Scientific classification
- Kingdom: Animalia
- Phylum: Arthropoda
- Class: Insecta
- Order: Coleoptera
- Suborder: Polyphaga
- Infraorder: Cucujiformia
- Family: Cerambycidae
- Genus: Aplanodema
- Species: A. lomii

Binomial name
- Aplanodema lomii (Breuning, 1938)

Species of beetle

Aplanodema lomii is a species of beetle in the family Cerambycidae, and the only species in the genus Aplanodema. It was described by Stephan von Breuning in 1938.
