= Theocris =

Scientific classification
- Kingdom: Animalia
- Phylum: Arthropoda
- Class: Insecta
- Order: Coleoptera
- Suborder: Polyphaga
- Infraorder: Cucujiformia
- Family: Cerambycidae
- Genus: Theocris
- Species: T. saga

Binomial name
- Theocris saga Thomson, 1858

Genus of beetles

Theocris saga is a species of beetle in the family Cerambycidae, and the only species in the genus Theocris. It was described by Thomson in 1858.
