= Eunidia subtesselata =

Scientific classification
- Kingdom: Animalia
- Phylum: Arthropoda
- Clade: Pancrustacea
- Class: Insecta
- Order: Coleoptera
- Suborder: Polyphaga
- Infraorder: Cucujiformia
- Family: Cerambycidae
- Genus: Eunidia
- Species: E. subtesselata

Binomial name
- Eunidia subtesselata Gahan, 1909

Species of beetle

Eunidia subtesselata is a species of beetle in the family Cerambycidae. It was described by Charles Joseph Gahan in 1909. It is known from Kenya, Ethiopia, and Somalia.

== Subspecies ==
- Eunidia subtessellata fulgurata Aurivillius, 1911
- Eunidia subtessellata subtessellata Gahan, 1909
