= Leuronotus spatulatus =

Scientific classification
- Kingdom: Animalia
- Phylum: Arthropoda
- Class: Insecta
- Order: Coleoptera
- Suborder: Polyphaga
- Infraorder: Cucujiformia
- Family: Cerambycidae
- Genus: Leuronotus
- Species: L. spatulatus

Binomial name
- Leuronotus spatulatus Gahan, 1888

Species of beetle

Leuronotus spatulatus is a species of beetle in the family Cerambycidae. It was described by Charles Joseph Gahan in 1888. It is known from Solomon Islands.
