= Tmesisternus mucronatus =

Scientific classification
- Domain: Eukaryota
- Kingdom: Animalia
- Phylum: Arthropoda
- Class: Insecta
- Order: Coleoptera
- Suborder: Polyphaga
- Infraorder: Cucujiformia
- Family: Cerambycidae
- Genus: Tmesisternus
- Species: T. mucronatus

Binomial name
- Tmesisternus mucronatus Gahan, 1916

Species of beetle

Tmesisternus mucronatus is a species of beetle in the family Cerambycidae. It was described by Charles Joseph Gahan in 1916.
