= Haplothrix simplex =

Scientific classification
- Kingdom: Animalia
- Phylum: Arthropoda
- Class: Insecta
- Order: Coleoptera
- Suborder: Polyphaga
- Infraorder: Cucujiformia
- Family: Cerambycidae
- Genus: Haplothrix
- Species: H. simplex

Binomial name
- Haplothrix simplex Gahan, 1888

Synonyms
- Hoplothrix simplex Gahan, 1888 (misspelling)

Species of beetle

Haplothrix simplex is a species of beetle in the family Cerambycidae. It was described by Charles Joseph Gahan in 1888, originally misspelled as Hoplothrix simplex. It is known from Thailand and Laos.
