= Glenea montivaga =

Scientific classification
- Domain: Eukaryota
- Kingdom: Animalia
- Phylum: Arthropoda
- Class: Insecta
- Order: Coleoptera
- Suborder: Polyphaga
- Infraorder: Cucujiformia
- Family: Cerambycidae
- Genus: Glenea
- Species: G. montivaga

Binomial name
- Glenea montivaga Gahan, 1909

Species of beetle

Glenea montivaga is a species of beetle in the family Cerambycidae. It was described by Charles Joseph Gahan in 1909. It is known from Uganda and the Democratic Republic of the Congo.
