= Glenea dejeani =

Scientific classification
- Kingdom: Animalia
- Phylum: Arthropoda
- Clade: Pancrustacea
- Class: Insecta
- Order: Coleoptera
- Suborder: Polyphaga
- Infraorder: Cucujiformia
- Family: Cerambycidae
- Genus: Glenea
- Species: G. dejeani

Binomial name
- Glenea dejeani Gahan, 1889

Species of beetle

Glenea dejeani is a species of beetle in the family Cerambycidae. It was described by Charles Joseph Gahan in 1889. It is known from Sumatra and Java.

== Varietas ==
- Glenea dejeani var. conjunctemaculata Breuning, 1956
- Glenea dejeani var. rubidofemoralis Breuning, 1956
