= Glenea johnstoni =

Scientific classification
- Domain: Eukaryota
- Kingdom: Animalia
- Phylum: Arthropoda
- Class: Insecta
- Order: Coleoptera
- Suborder: Polyphaga
- Infraorder: Cucujiformia
- Family: Cerambycidae
- Genus: Glenea
- Species: G. johnstoni

Binomial name
- Glenea johnstoni Gahan, 1902

Synonyms
- Glenea mira var. transverselatevittata Breuning, 1953

Species of beetle

Glenea johnstoni is a species of beetle in the family Cerambycidae. It was described by Charles Joseph Gahan in 1902. It is known from Uganda, Cameroon, and the Democratic Republic of the Congo.

== Subspecies ==
- Glenea johnstoni germaini Breuning, 1965
- Glenea johnstoni johnstoni Gahan, 1902
