= Epectasis similis =

Scientific classification
- Domain: Eukaryota
- Kingdom: Animalia
- Phylum: Arthropoda
- Class: Insecta
- Order: Coleoptera
- Suborder: Polyphaga
- Infraorder: Cucujiformia
- Family: Cerambycidae
- Tribe: Pteropliini
- Genus: Epectasis
- Species: E. similis

Binomial name
- Epectasis similis Gahan, 1895

Species of beetle

Epectasis similis is a species of beetle in the family Cerambycidae. It was described by Charles Joseph Gahan in 1895. It is known from Saint Vincent and the Grenadines, Grenada, Martinique, Guadeloupe, and Dominica.
