= Glenea chlorospila =

Scientific classification
- Domain: Eukaryota
- Kingdom: Animalia
- Phylum: Arthropoda
- Class: Insecta
- Order: Coleoptera
- Suborder: Polyphaga
- Infraorder: Cucujiformia
- Family: Cerambycidae
- Genus: Glenea
- Species: G. chlorospila

Binomial name
- Glenea chlorospila Gahan, 1897

Species of beetle

Glenea chlorospila is a species of beetle in the family Cerambycidae. It was described by Charles Joseph Gahan in 1897. It is known from Taiwan and Japan.

== Subspecies ==
- Glenea chlorospila chlorospila Gahan, 1897
- Glenea chlorospila hachijonis Matsumura & Matsushita, 1933
- Glenea chlorospila hayashii Nakane, 1963
- Glenea chlorospila okinawensis Makihara, 1988
