= Glenea lineata =

Scientific classification
- Domain: Eukaryota
- Kingdom: Animalia
- Phylum: Arthropoda
- Class: Insecta
- Order: Coleoptera
- Suborder: Polyphaga
- Infraorder: Cucujiformia
- Family: Cerambycidae
- Genus: Glenea
- Species: G. lineata

Binomial name
- Glenea lineata Gahan, 1897

Species of beetle

Glenea lineata is a species of beetle in the family Cerambycidae. It was described by Charles Joseph Gahan in 1897.

== Subspecies ==
- Glenea lineata ihai Hayashi, 1960
- Glenea lineata lineata Gahan, 1897
- Glenea lineata okinawana Ohbayashi & Ohbayashi, 1965
- Glenea lineata ryukyuensis Breuning & Ohbayashi, 1964
- Glenea lineata sauteri Schwarzer, 1925
