= Mecas marmorata =

Scientific classification
- Kingdom: Animalia
- Phylum: Arthropoda
- Class: Insecta
- Order: Coleoptera
- Suborder: Polyphaga
- Infraorder: Cucujiformia
- Family: Cerambycidae
- Genus: Mecas
- Species: M. marmorata

Binomial name
- Mecas marmorata Gahan, 1892

Species of beetle

Mecas marmorata is a species of longhorn beetles, described by Charles Joseph Gahan in 1892. It is known to be from Mexico.
