= Eunidia plagiata =

Scientific classification
- Kingdom: Animalia
- Phylum: Arthropoda
- Clade: Pancrustacea
- Class: Insecta
- Order: Coleoptera
- Suborder: Polyphaga
- Infraorder: Cucujiformia
- Family: Cerambycidae
- Genus: Eunidia
- Species: E. plagiata

Binomial name
- Eunidia plagiata Gahan, 1898

Synonyms
- Eunidia nigritarsis Breuning, 1953; Eunidia plagifera Aurivillius, 1922; Eunidia subreticulata Aurivillius, 1914

Species of beetle

Eunidia plagiata is a species of beetle in the family Cerambycidae. It was described by Charles Joseph Gahan in 1898. It is known from Chad, Kenya, Zimbabwe, Mozambique, Ethiopia, South Africa, Botswana, and Tanzania.

== Subspecies ==
- Eunidia plagiata plagiata Gahan, 1898
- Eunidia plagiata teocchii Adlbauer, 2000
