= Ochromima marginicollis =

Scientific classification
- Kingdom: Animalia
- Phylum: Arthropoda
- Class: Insecta
- Order: Coleoptera
- Suborder: Polyphaga
- Infraorder: Cucujiformia
- Family: Cerambycidae
- Genus: Ochromima
- Species: O. marginicollis

Binomial name
- Ochromima marginicollis (Gahan, 1889)

Species of beetle

Ochromima marginicollis is a species of beetle in the family Cerambycidae. It was described by Charles Joseph Gahan in 1889. It is known from Brazil and French Guiana.
