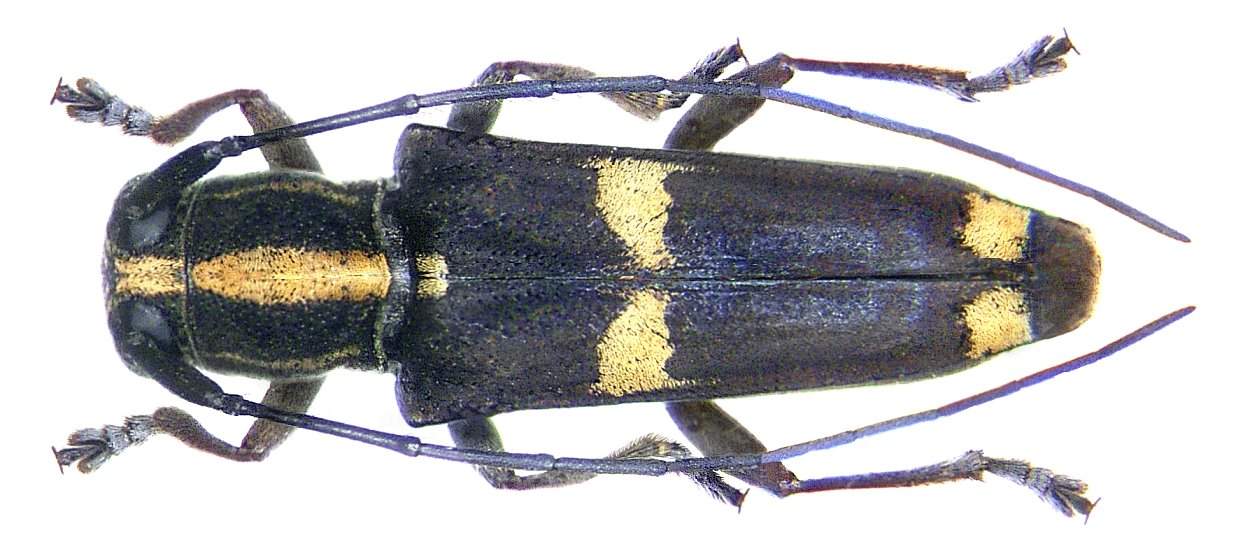

Scientific classification
- Domain: Eukaryota
- Kingdom: Animalia
- Phylum: Arthropoda
- Class: Insecta
- Order: Coleoptera
- Suborder: Polyphaga
- Infraorder: Cucujiformia
- Family: Cerambycidae
- Genus: Glenea
- Species: G. papuensis

Binomial name
- Glenea papuensis Gahan, 1897

= Glenea papuensis =

Species of beetle

Glenea papuensis is a species of beetle in the family Cerambycidae. It was described by Charles Joseph Gahan in 1897. It is known from Indonesia.

== Subspecies ==
- Glenea papuensis bivittipennis Breuning, 1958
- Glenea papuensis papuensis Gahan, 1897
