= Nanohammus aberrans =

Scientific classification
- Domain: Eukaryota
- Kingdom: Animalia
- Phylum: Arthropoda
- Class: Insecta
- Order: Coleoptera
- Suborder: Polyphaga
- Infraorder: Cucujiformia
- Family: Cerambycidae
- Tribe: Lamiini
- Genus: Nanohammus
- Species: N. aberrans

Binomial name
- Nanohammus aberrans (Gahan, 1894)

Synonyms
- Microcycos abdominalis Pic, 1934; Rhodopis aberrans Gahan, 1894

Species of beetle

Nanohammus aberrans is a species of beetle in the family Cerambycidae. It was described by Charles Joseph Gahan in 1894.
