= Pterolophia armata =

Scientific classification
- Domain: Eukaryota
- Kingdom: Animalia
- Phylum: Arthropoda
- Class: Insecta
- Order: Coleoptera
- Suborder: Polyphaga
- Infraorder: Cucujiformia
- Family: Cerambycidae
- Tribe: Pteropliini
- Genus: Pterolophia
- Species: P. armata

Binomial name
- Pterolophia armata Gahan, 1894

Species of beetle

Pterolophia armata is a species of beetle in the family Cerambycidae. It was described by Charles Joseph Gahan in 1894.
