= Glenea propinqua =

Scientific classification
- Domain: Eukaryota
- Kingdom: Animalia
- Phylum: Arthropoda
- Class: Insecta
- Order: Coleoptera
- Suborder: Polyphaga
- Infraorder: Cucujiformia
- Family: Cerambycidae
- Genus: Glenea
- Species: G. propinqua

Binomial name
- Glenea propinqua Gahan, 1897

Species of beetle

Glenea propinqua is a species of beetle in the family Cerambycidae. It was described by Charles Joseph Gahan in 1897. It is known from Malaysia, Laos, and Singapore.

== Subspecies ==
- Glenea propinqua propinqua Gahan, 1897
- Glenea propinqua vientianana Breuning, 1965
