= Glenea subsimilis =

Scientific classification
- Domain: Eukaryota
- Kingdom: Animalia
- Phylum: Arthropoda
- Class: Insecta
- Order: Coleoptera
- Suborder: Polyphaga
- Infraorder: Cucujiformia
- Family: Cerambycidae
- Genus: Glenea
- Species: G. subsimilis

Binomial name
- Glenea subsimilis Gahan, 1897

Species of beetle

Glenea subsimilis is a species of beetle in the family Cerambycidae. It was described by Charles Joseph Gahan in 1897. It is known from India, Vietnam, Laos and China. It contains the varietas Glenea subsimilis var. rubripes.
