= Lahejia =

Scientific classification
- Kingdom: Animalia
- Phylum: Arthropoda
- Clade: Pancrustacea
- Class: Insecta
- Order: Coleoptera
- Suborder: Polyphaga
- Infraorder: Cucujiformia
- Family: Chrysomelidae
- Subfamily: Eumolpinae
- Tribe: Bromiini
- Genus: Lahejia; Gahan, 1896

Type species
- Lahejia cinerascens Gahan, 1896

Synonyms
- Pseudomalegia Jacoby, 1897

Genus of leaf beetles

Lahejia is a genus of leaf beetles in the subfamily Eumolpinae. It is known from Africa and Asia. It is related to Malegia.

== Taxonomy ==
The genus was first created in 1896 by Charles Joseph Gahan for the single species Lahejia cinerascens, which was collected by Lieutenant-Colonel John William Yerbury from Lahij, Yemen (spelled as "Lahej" in the paper). In 2002, Stefano Zoia determined that Pseudomalegia (a genus created by Martin Jacoby in 1897) was a synonym of Lahejia, transferring to the latter genus six more species (while a seventh became a synonym of L. cinerascens). In 2010, two further species were moved to the genus from Microlypesthes and Malegia in the sixth volume of the Catalogue of Palaearctic Coleoptera.

== Species ==
- Lahejia aenea (Chen, 1940) – China (Guangdong, Hebei, Jiangsu, Sichuan), Russian Far East
- Lahejia cinerascens Gahan, 1896 – Yemen, Saudi Arabia
- Lahejia fulvipes (Jacoby, 1898) – South Africa, Chad
- Lahejia jacobsoni (Sumakov, 1901) – Turkmenistan
- Lahejia lefevrei (Jacoby, 1897) – South Africa
- Lahejia minuta (Weise, 1919) – Tanzania
- Lahejia schimperi (Lefèvre, 1891) – Ethiopia, Tanzania, South Africa
- Lahejia tibialis (Jacoby, 1901) – South Africa
- Lahejia turkestanica (Reitter, 1890) – Kazakhstan, Kyrgyzstan, Tajikistan, Uzbekistan
