= Pterolophia albocincta =

Scientific classification
- Kingdom: Animalia
- Phylum: Arthropoda
- Clade: Pancrustacea
- Class: Insecta
- Order: Coleoptera
- Suborder: Polyphaga
- Infraorder: Cucujiformia
- Family: Cerambycidae
- Genus: Pterolophia
- Species: P. albocincta

Binomial name
- Pterolophia albocincta Gahan, 1894

Synonyms
- Pterolophia alluaudi Breuning, 1938

Species of beetle

Pterolophia albocincta is a species of beetle in the family Cerambycidae. It was described by Charles Joseph Gahan in 1894. It is known from Somalia, Ethiopia and Kenya.
