= Acalolepta longiscapus =

Scientific classification
- Domain: Eukaryota
- Kingdom: Animalia
- Phylum: Arthropoda
- Class: Insecta
- Order: Coleoptera
- Suborder: Polyphaga
- Infraorder: Cucujiformia
- Family: Cerambycidae
- Tribe: Lamiini
- Genus: Acalolepta
- Species: A. longiscapus

Binomial name
- Acalolepta longiscapus (Gahan, 1894)

Synonyms
- Haplohammus longiscapus Gahan, 1894

Species of beetle

Acalolepta longiscapus is a species of beetle in the family Cerambycidae. It was described by Charles Joseph Gahan in 1894. It is known from Malaysia, Laos, Myanmar and India.
