= Pterolophia beccarii =

Scientific classification
- Domain: Eukaryota
- Kingdom: Animalia
- Phylum: Arthropoda
- Class: Insecta
- Order: Coleoptera
- Suborder: Polyphaga
- Infraorder: Cucujiformia
- Family: Cerambycidae
- Tribe: Pteropliini
- Genus: Pterolophia
- Species: P. beccarii

Binomial name
- Pterolophia beccarii Gahan, 1907

Species of beetle

Pterolophia beccarii is a species of beetle in the family Cerambycidae. It was described by Charles Joseph Gahan in 1907.
