= Glenea andrewesi =

Scientific classification
- Domain: Eukaryota
- Kingdom: Animalia
- Phylum: Arthropoda
- Class: Insecta
- Order: Coleoptera
- Suborder: Polyphaga
- Infraorder: Cucujiformia
- Family: Cerambycidae
- Genus: Glenea
- Species: G. andrewesi

Binomial name
- Glenea andrewesi Gahan, 1893

Species of beetle

Glenea andrewesi is a species of beetle in the family Cerambycidae. It was described by Charles Joseph Gahan in 1893. It is known from India.
