= Glenea wallacei =

Scientific classification
- Kingdom: Animalia
- Phylum: Arthropoda
- Class: Insecta
- Order: Coleoptera
- Suborder: Polyphaga
- Infraorder: Cucujiformia
- Family: Cerambycidae
- Genus: Glenea
- Species: G. wallacei

Binomial name
- Glenea wallacei Gahan, 1897

Species of beetle

Glenea wallacei is a species of beetle in the family Cerambycidae. It was described by Charles Joseph Gahan in 1897. It is known from Borneo.
