= Haplothrix amicator =

Scientific classification
- Kingdom: Animalia
- Phylum: Arthropoda
- Class: Insecta
- Order: Coleoptera
- Suborder: Polyphaga
- Infraorder: Cucujiformia
- Family: Cerambycidae
- Genus: Haplothrix
- Species: H. amicator

Binomial name
- Haplothrix amicator (Gahan, 1888)

Synonyms
- Monochamus amicator Gahan, 1888

Species of beetle

Haplothrix amicator is a species of beetle in the family Cerambycidae. It was described by Charles Joseph Gahan in 1888.
