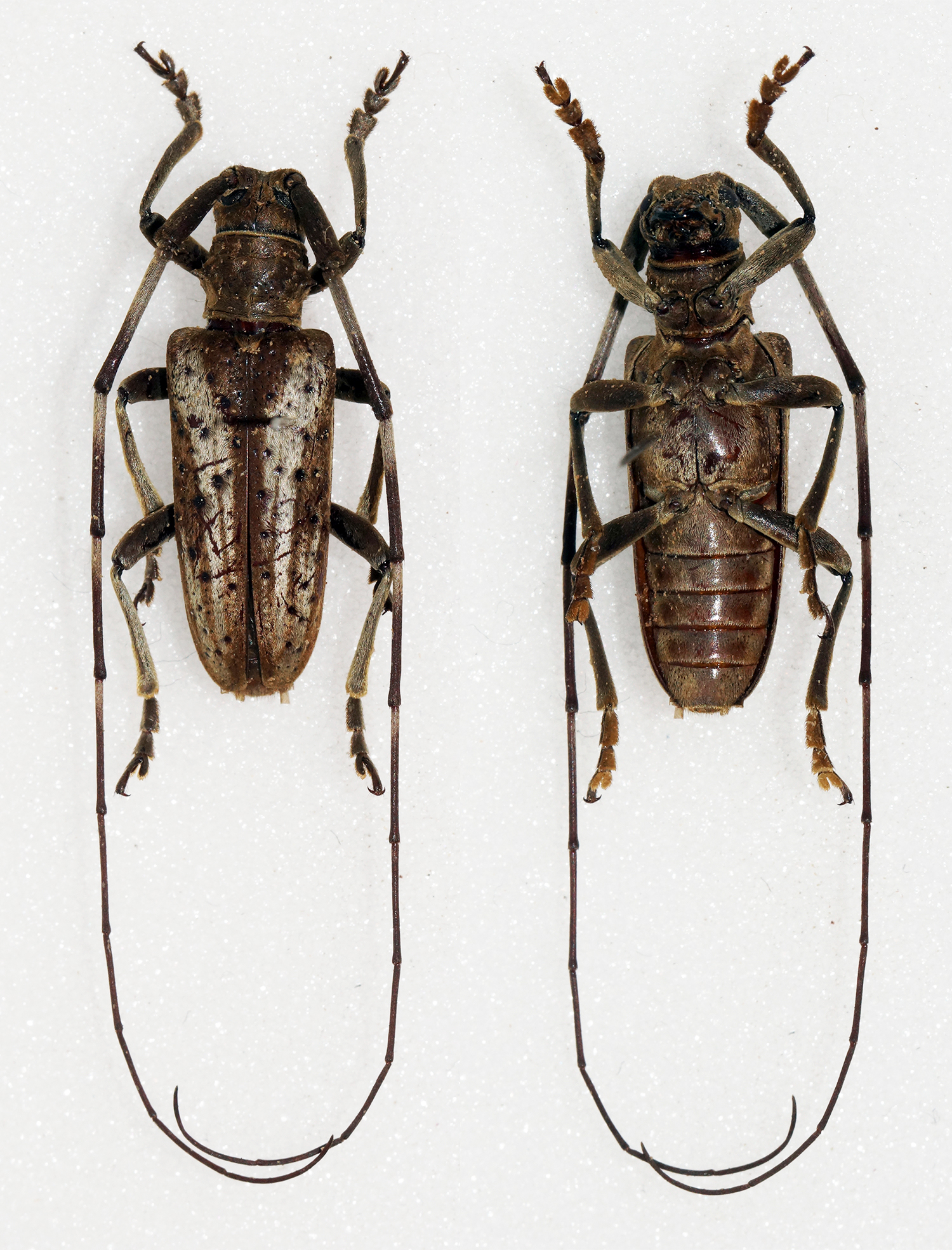

Scientific classification
- Kingdom: Animalia
- Phylum: Arthropoda
- Class: Insecta
- Order: Coleoptera
- Suborder: Polyphaga
- Infraorder: Cucujiformia
- Family: Cerambycidae
- Genus: Haplothrix
- Species: H. rivulosus

Binomial name
- Haplothrix rivulosus (Gahan, 1888)

= Haplothrix rivulosus =

Species of beetle

Haplothrix rivulosus is a species of beetle in the family Cerambycidae. It was described by Charles Joseph Gahan in 1888.
