= Acalolepta basicornis =

Scientific classification
- Domain: Eukaryota
- Kingdom: Animalia
- Phylum: Arthropoda
- Class: Insecta
- Order: Coleoptera
- Suborder: Polyphaga
- Infraorder: Cucujiformia
- Family: Cerambycidae
- Tribe: Lamiini
- Genus: Acalolepta
- Species: A. basicornis

Binomial name
- Acalolepta basicornis (Gahan, 1895)

Species of beetle

Acalolepta basicornis is a species of beetle in the family Cerambycidae. It was described by Charles Joseph Gahan in 1895. It is known from Laos, China, India, Vietnam, and Myanmar.
