= Mexicoscylus bivittatus =

Scientific classification
- Kingdom: Animalia
- Phylum: Arthropoda
- Class: Insecta
- Order: Coleoptera
- Suborder: Polyphaga
- Infraorder: Cucujiformia
- Family: Cerambycidae
- Genus: Mexicoscylus
- Species: M. bivittatus

Binomial name
- Mexicoscylus bivittatus (Gahan, 1892)

Species of beetle

Mexicoscylus bivittatus is a species of beetle in the family Cerambycidae. It was described by Charles Joseph Gahan in 1892. It is known from Mexico.
