= Acalolepta admixta =

Scientific classification
- Domain: Eukaryota
- Kingdom: Animalia
- Phylum: Arthropoda
- Class: Insecta
- Order: Coleoptera
- Suborder: Polyphaga
- Infraorder: Cucujiformia
- Family: Cerambycidae
- Tribe: Lamiini
- Genus: Acalolepta
- Species: A. admixta

Binomial name
- Acalolepta admixta (Gahan, 1894)

Synonyms
- Haplohammus admixtus Gahan, 1894

Species of beetle

Acalolepta admixta is a species of beetle in the family Cerambycidae. It was described by Charles Joseph Gahan in 1894. It is known from Malaysia, the Andaman Islands, and Myanmar.
