= Acalolepta persimilis =

Scientific classification
- Domain: Eukaryota
- Kingdom: Animalia
- Phylum: Arthropoda
- Class: Insecta
- Order: Coleoptera
- Suborder: Polyphaga
- Infraorder: Cucujiformia
- Family: Cerambycidae
- Tribe: Lamiini
- Genus: Acalolepta
- Species: A. persimilis

Binomial name
- Acalolepta persimilis (Gahan, 1907)

Species of beetle

Acalolepta persimilis is a species of beetle in the family Cerambycidae. It was described by Charles Joseph Gahan in 1907. It is known from the Nicobar and Andaman Islands, and Sumatra.
