= Glenea speciosa =

Scientific classification
- Domain: Eukaryota
- Kingdom: Animalia
- Phylum: Arthropoda
- Class: Insecta
- Order: Coleoptera
- Suborder: Polyphaga
- Infraorder: Cucujiformia
- Family: Cerambycidae
- Genus: Glenea
- Species: G. speciosa

Binomial name
- Glenea speciosa Gahan, 1889

Species of beetle

Glenea speciosa is a species of beetle in the family Cerambycidae. It was described by Charles Joseph Gahan in 1889.
