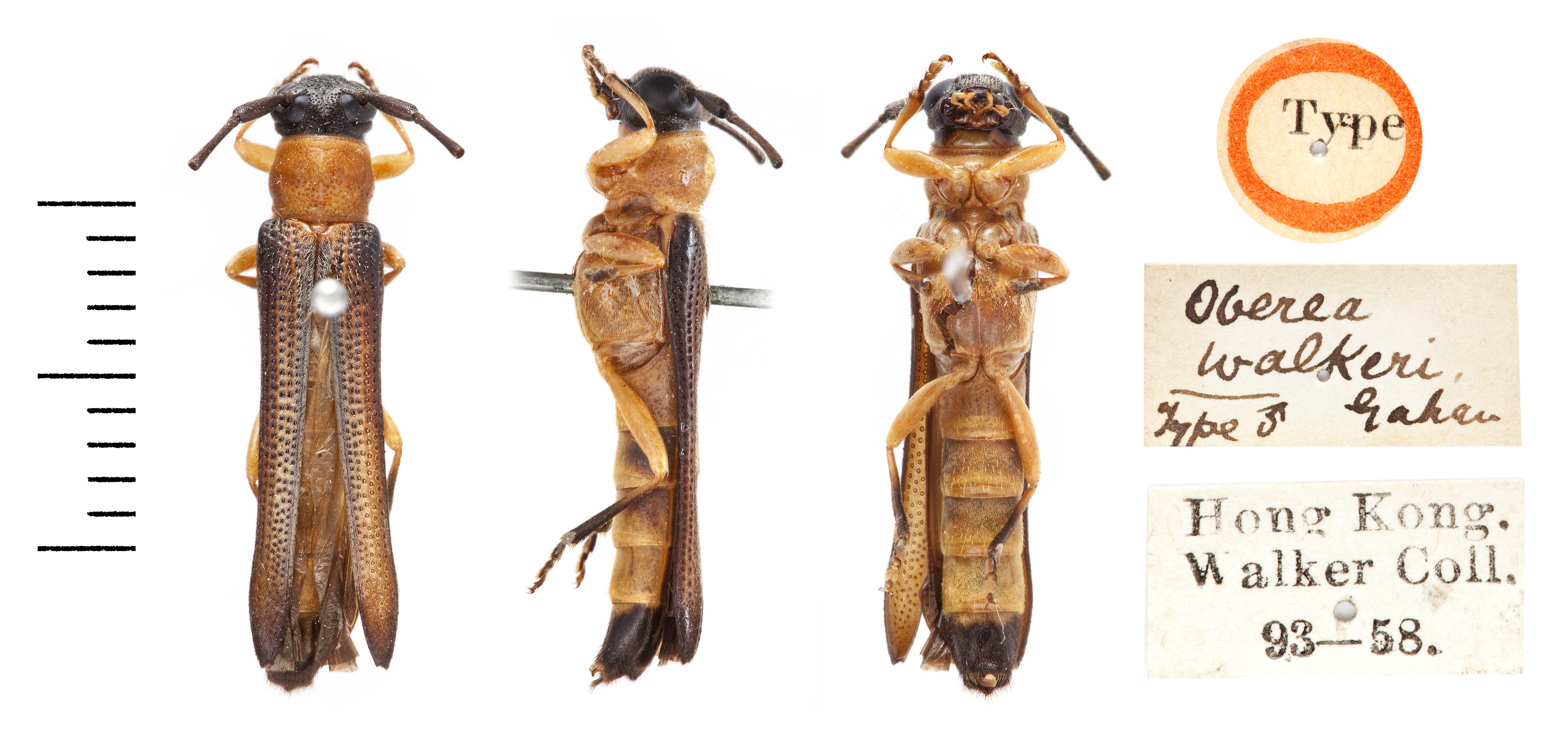

Scientific classification
- Domain: Eukaryota
- Kingdom: Animalia
- Phylum: Arthropoda
- Class: Insecta
- Order: Coleoptera
- Suborder: Polyphaga
- Infraorder: Cucujiformia
- Family: Cerambycidae
- Genus: Oberea
- Species: O. walkeri

Binomial name
- Oberea walkeri Gahan, 1894

Synonyms
- Oberea atroanalis Fairmaire, 1895; Oberea robustior Pic, 1923; Oberea bicoloritarsis Pic, 1923

= Oberea walkeri =

Species of beetle

Oberea walkeri is a species of beetle in the family Cerambycidae. It was described by Charles Joseph Gahan in 1894. It is known from Myanmar, Hong Kong, Laos, China, and Vietnam.
