= Icupima laevipennis =

Scientific classification
- Kingdom: Animalia
- Phylum: Arthropoda
- Class: Insecta
- Order: Coleoptera
- Suborder: Polyphaga
- Infraorder: Cucujiformia
- Family: Cerambycidae
- Genus: Icupima
- Species: I. laevipennis

Binomial name
- Icupima laevipennis (Gahan, 1892)

Synonyms
- Lycidola levipennis Gahan, 1892

Species of beetle

Icupima laevipennis is a species of beetle in the family Cerambycidae. It was described by Charles Joseph Gahan in 1892. It is known from Ecuador and Panama.
