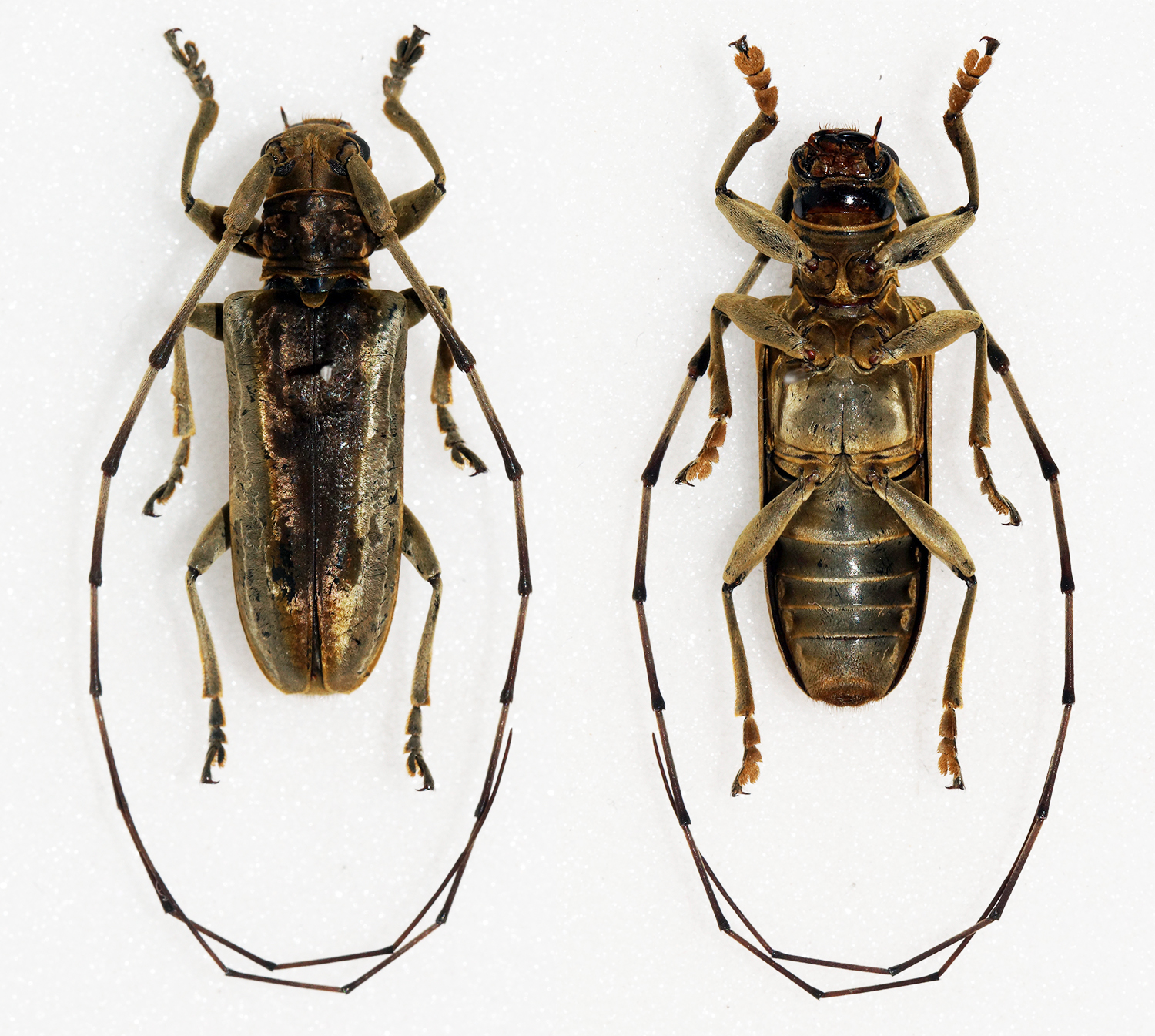

Scientific classification
- Kingdom: Animalia
- Phylum: Arthropoda
- Class: Insecta
- Order: Coleoptera
- Suborder: Polyphaga
- Infraorder: Cucujiformia
- Family: Cerambycidae
- Genus: Acalolepta
- Species: A. speciosa

Binomial name
- Acalolepta speciosa (Gahan, 1888)

Synonyms
- Haplohammus speciosus Gahan, 1888; Dihammus speciosus (Gahan, 1888)

= Acalolepta speciosa =

Species of beetle

Acalolepta speciosa is a species of beetle in the family Cerambycidae. It is found in East and Southeast Asia, in southern China (from Sichuan and Jiangsu southwards, including Hainan and Hongkong), Taiwan, Vietnam, and Laos.

Acalolepta speciosa measure 14–26 mm (0.55–1.02 in) in length.
