= Acalolepta nativitatis =

Scientific classification
- Domain: Eukaryota
- Kingdom: Animalia
- Phylum: Arthropoda
- Class: Insecta
- Order: Coleoptera
- Suborder: Polyphaga
- Infraorder: Cucujiformia
- Family: Cerambycidae
- Tribe: Lamiini
- Genus: Acalolepta
- Species: A. nativitatis

Binomial name
- Acalolepta nativitatis (Gahan, 1888)

Synonyms
- Monochamus nativitatis Gahan, 1888

Species of beetle

Acalolepta nativitatis is a species of beetle in the family Cerambycidae. It was described by Charles Joseph Gahan in 1888. It is known from Australia.
