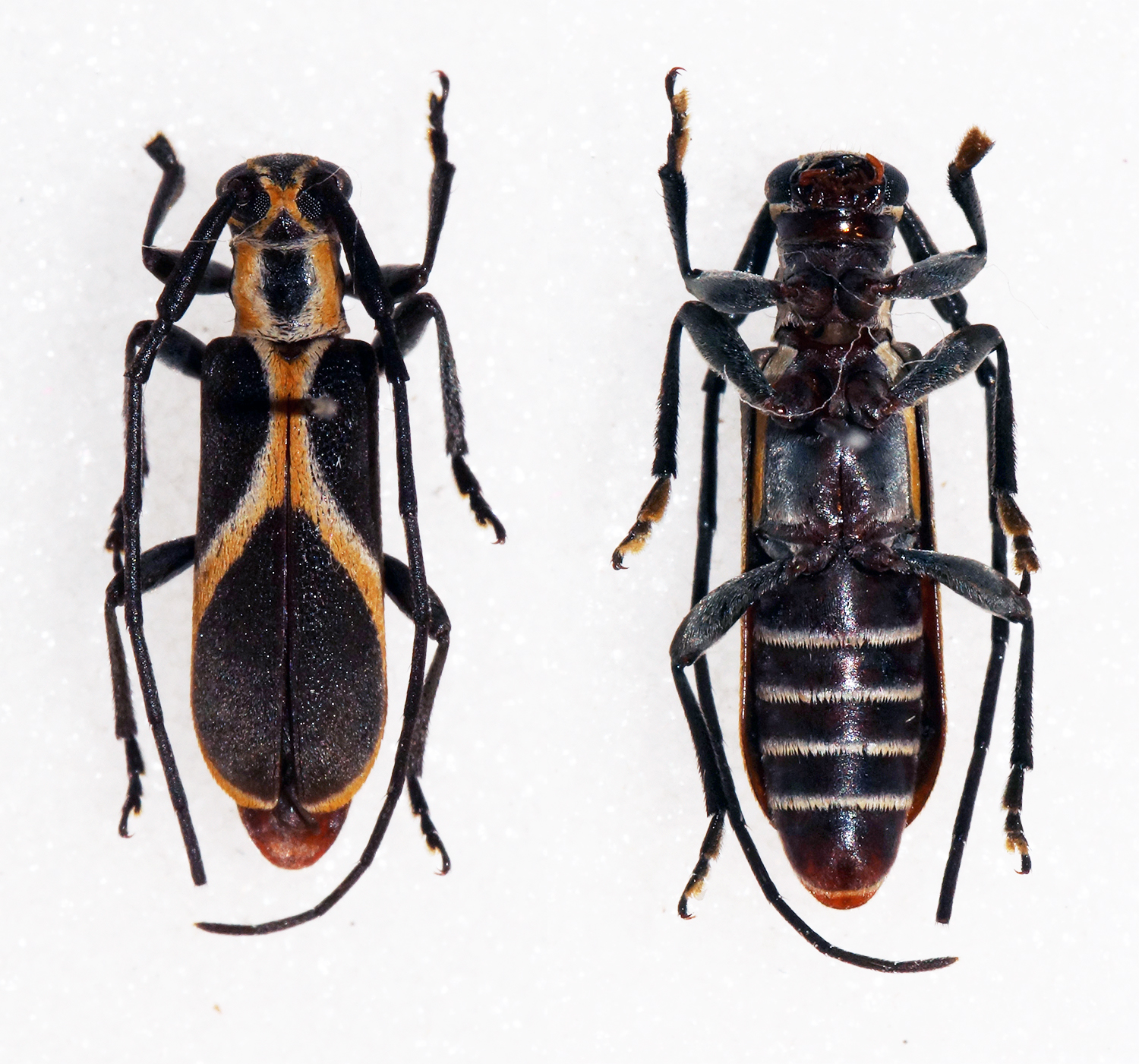

Scientific classification
- Kingdom: Animalia
- Phylum: Arthropoda
- Clade: Pancrustacea
- Class: Insecta
- Order: Coleoptera
- Suborder: Polyphaga
- Infraorder: Cucujiformia
- Family: Cerambycidae
- Genus: Eunidia
- Species: E. euzonata

Binomial name
- Eunidia euzonata Gahan, 1904

= Eunidia euzonata =

Species of beetle

Eunidia euzonata is a species of beetle in the family Cerambycidae. It was described by Charles Joseph Gahan in 1904.
