= Glenea posticata =

Scientific classification
- Domain: Eukaryota
- Kingdom: Animalia
- Phylum: Arthropoda
- Class: Insecta
- Order: Coleoptera
- Suborder: Polyphaga
- Infraorder: Cucujiformia
- Family: Cerambycidae
- Genus: Glenea
- Species: G. posticata

Binomial name
- Glenea posticata Gahan, 1895

Synonyms
- Glenea vitalisi Pic, 1926

Species of beetle

Glenea posticata is a species of beetle in the family Cerambycidae. It was described by Charles Joseph Gahan in 1895. It is known from Myanmar and Laos.
