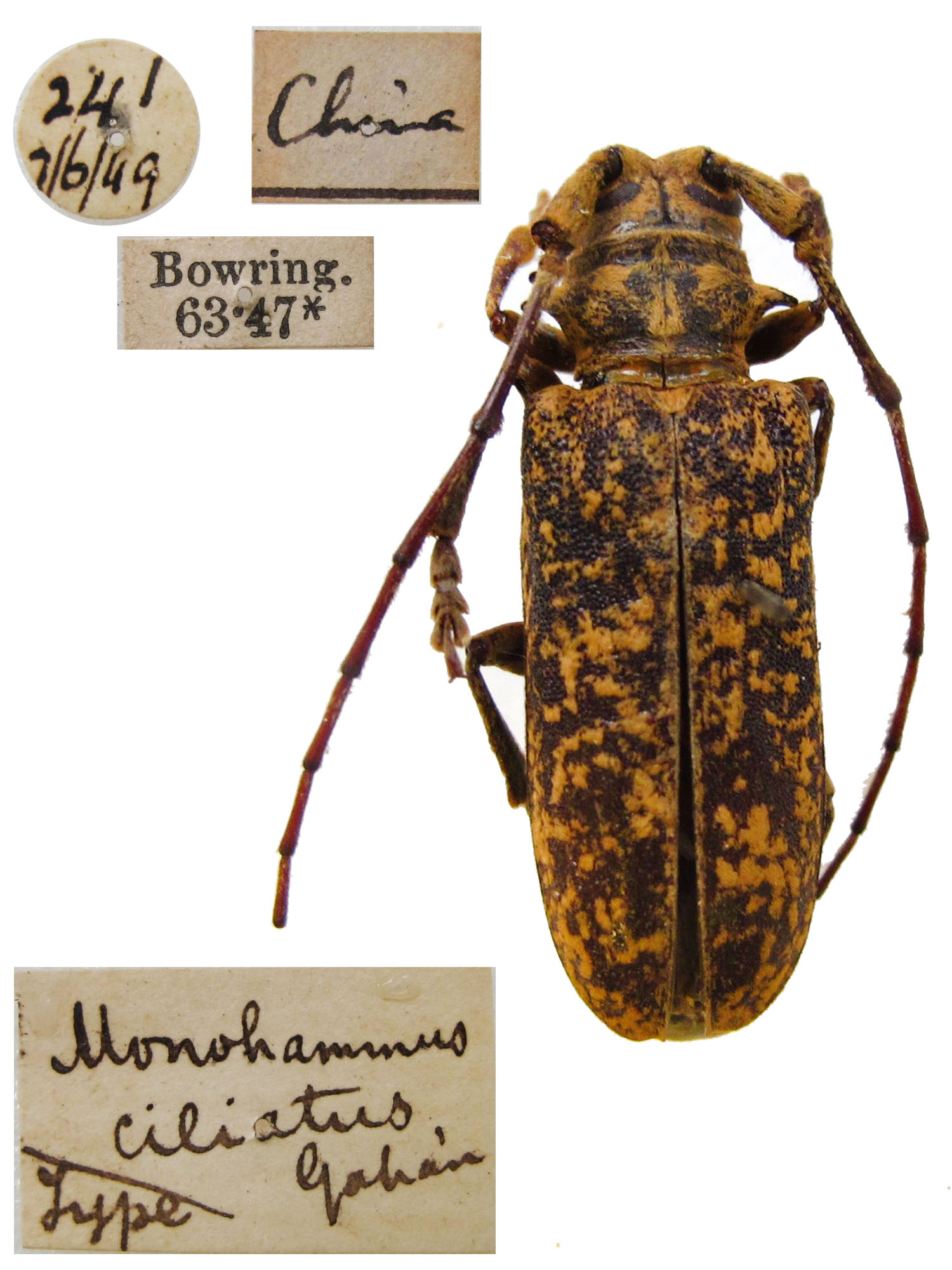
- Mecynippus ciliatus

Scientific classification
- Kingdom: Animalia
- Phylum: Arthropoda
- Class: Insecta
- Order: Coleoptera
- Suborder: Polyphaga
- Infraorder: Cucujiformia
- Family: Cerambycidae
- Genus: Mecynippus
- Species: M. ciliatus

Binomial name
- Mecynippus ciliatus (Gahan, 1888)

Synonyms
- Meges ciliatus (Gahan, 1888); Mimothestus delkeskampi Breuning, 1961; Mimothestus luteicornis Xie, Shi & Wang, 2012; Monochamus ciliatus Gahan, 1888; Monochamus rondoni Breuning, 1965

= Mecynippus ciliatus =

Species of beetle

Mecynippus ciliatus is a species of beetle in the family Cerambycidae. It was described by Charles Joseph Gahan in 1888, originally under the genus Monochamus. It is known from Laos and China.
