= Glenea albofasciata =

Scientific classification
- Domain: Eukaryota
- Kingdom: Animalia
- Phylum: Arthropoda
- Class: Insecta
- Order: Coleoptera
- Suborder: Polyphaga
- Infraorder: Cucujiformia
- Family: Cerambycidae
- Genus: Glenea
- Species: G. albofasciata

Binomial name
- Glenea albofasciata Gahan, 1897

Synonyms
- Glenea torquata Aurivillius, 1907

Species of beetle

Glenea albofasciata is a species of beetle in the family Cerambycidae. It was described by Charles Joseph Gahan in 1897.
