= Eunidia subfasciata =

Scientific classification
- Kingdom: Animalia
- Phylum: Arthropoda
- Clade: Pancrustacea
- Class: Insecta
- Order: Coleoptera
- Suborder: Polyphaga
- Infraorder: Cucujiformia
- Family: Cerambycidae
- Genus: Eunidia
- Species: E. subfasciata

Binomial name
- Eunidia subfasciata Gahan, 1898

Species of beetle

Eunidia subfasciata is a species of beetle in the family Cerambycidae. It was described by Charles Joseph Gahan in 1898.
