= Eunidia spilota =

Scientific classification
- Kingdom: Animalia
- Phylum: Arthropoda
- Clade: Pancrustacea
- Class: Insecta
- Order: Coleoptera
- Suborder: Polyphaga
- Infraorder: Cucujiformia
- Family: Cerambycidae
- Genus: Eunidia
- Species: E. spilota

Binomial name
- Eunidia spilota Gahan, 1904

Synonyms
- Eunidia quadriflavomaculata Breuning, 1953; Eunidia quadriflavomaculata m. flavovittipennis Breuning, 1981

Species of beetle

Eunidia spilota is a species of beetle in the family Cerambycidae. It was described by Charles Joseph Gahan in 1904.
