= Tmesisternus multiplicatus =

Scientific classification
- Domain: Eukaryota
- Kingdom: Animalia
- Phylum: Arthropoda
- Class: Insecta
- Order: Coleoptera
- Suborder: Polyphaga
- Infraorder: Cucujiformia
- Family: Cerambycidae
- Genus: Tmesisternus
- Species: T. multiplicatus

Binomial name
- Tmesisternus multiplicatus Gahan, 1915

Synonyms
- Tmesisternus pleurostictus ? Breuning, 1945

Species of beetle

Tmesisternus multiplicatus is a species of beetle in the family Cerambycidae. It was described by Charles Joseph Gahan in 1915.
