= Pseudotaxalus angustus =

Scientific classification
- Domain: Eukaryota
- Kingdom: Animalia
- Phylum: Arthropoda
- Class: Insecta
- Order: Coleoptera
- Suborder: Polyphaga
- Infraorder: Cucujiformia
- Family: Cerambycidae
- Genus: Pseudotaxalus
- Species: P. angustus

Binomial name
- Pseudotaxalus angustus (Gahan, 1894)

Synonyms
- Lychrosis angustus Gahan, 1894

Species of beetle

Pseudotaxalus angustus is a species of beetle in the family Cerambycidae. It was described by Charles Joseph Gahan in 1894, originally under the genus Lychrosis.
