= Lahejia cinerascens =

Scientific classification
- Kingdom: Animalia
- Phylum: Arthropoda
- Clade: Pancrustacea
- Class: Insecta
- Order: Coleoptera
- Suborder: Polyphaga
- Infraorder: Cucujiformia
- Family: Chrysomelidae
- Genus: Lahejia
- Species: L. cinerascens

Binomial name
- Lahejia cinerascens Gahan, 1896

Synonyms
- Malegia donckieri Pic, 1904

Species of beetle

Lahejia cinerascens is a species of leaf beetle of Saudi Arabia and Yemen described by Charles Joseph Gahan in 1896.
