= Glenea erythrodera =

Scientific classification
- Domain: Eukaryota
- Kingdom: Animalia
- Phylum: Arthropoda
- Class: Insecta
- Order: Coleoptera
- Suborder: Polyphaga
- Infraorder: Cucujiformia
- Family: Cerambycidae
- Genus: Glenea
- Species: G. erythrodera

Binomial name
- Glenea erythrodera Gahan, 1907

Species of beetle

Glenea erythrodera is a species of beetle in the family Cerambycidae. It was described by Charles Joseph Gahan in 1907. It is found on Sumatra.
