= Acalolepta longipennis =

Scientific classification
- Domain: Eukaryota
- Kingdom: Animalia
- Phylum: Arthropoda
- Class: Insecta
- Order: Coleoptera
- Suborder: Polyphaga
- Infraorder: Cucujiformia
- Family: Cerambycidae
- Tribe: Lamiini
- Genus: Acalolepta
- Species: A. longipennis

Binomial name
- Acalolepta longipennis (Gahan, 1894)

Synonyms
- Haplohammus longipennis Gahan, 1894

Species of beetle

Acalolepta longipennis is a species of beetle in the family Cerambycidae. It was described by Charles Joseph Gahan in 1894. It is known from Papua New Guinea.
