= Glenea aluensis =

Scientific classification
- Domain: Eukaryota
- Kingdom: Animalia
- Phylum: Arthropoda
- Class: Insecta
- Order: Coleoptera
- Suborder: Polyphaga
- Infraorder: Cucujiformia
- Family: Cerambycidae
- Genus: Glenea
- Species: G. aluensis

Binomial name
- Glenea aluensis Gahan, 1897

Species of beetle

Glenea aluensis is a species of beetle in the family Cerambycidae. It was described by Charles Joseph Gahan in 1897.

== Subspecies ==
- Glenea aluensis aluensis Gahan, 1897
- Glenea aluensis vivesi Breuning, 1978
