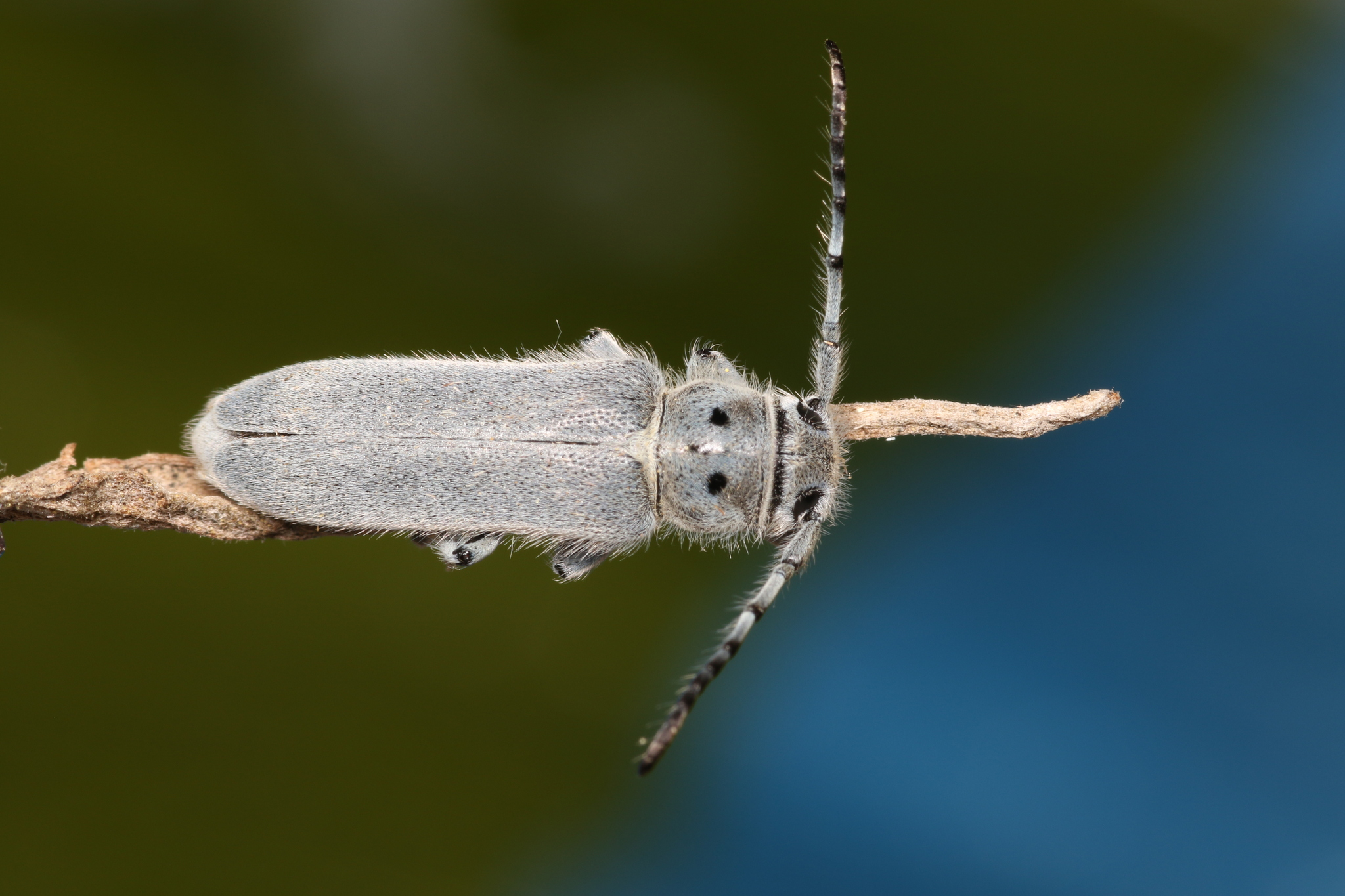

Scientific classification
- Domain: Eukaryota
- Kingdom: Animalia
- Phylum: Arthropoda
- Class: Insecta
- Order: Coleoptera
- Suborder: Polyphaga
- Infraorder: Cucujiformia
- Family: Cerambycidae
- Subfamily: Lamiinae
- Tribe: Saperdini
- Genus: Mecas
- Species: M. bicallosa

Binomial name
- Mecas bicallosa Martin, 1924

= Mecas bicallosa =

Species of beetle

Mecas bicallosa is a species of longhorned beetle found in North and Central America. It was first described by Martin in 1924.
