= Ochromima =

Scientific classification
- Kingdom: Animalia
- Phylum: Arthropoda
- Class: Insecta
- Order: Coleoptera
- Suborder: Polyphaga
- Infraorder: Cucujiformia
- Family: Cerambycidae
- Subfamily: Lamiinae
- Tribe: Hemilophini
- Genus: Ochromima; Bates, 1881

Genus of beetles

Ochromima is a genus of longhorn beetles of the subfamily Lamiinae, containing the following species:

- Ochromima marginicollis (Gahan, 1889)
- Ochromima megalopoides (Bates, 1866)
- Ochromima pallipes (Olivier, 1795)
