= Estigmenida robusta =

Scientific classification
- Kingdom: Animalia
- Phylum: Arthropoda
- Class: Insecta
- Order: Coleoptera
- Suborder: Polyphaga
- Infraorder: Cucujiformia
- Family: Cerambycidae
- Genus: Estigmenida
- Species: E. robusta

Binomial name
- Estigmenida robusta Breuning, 1940

Species of beetle

Estigmenida robusta is a genus of beetles in the family Cerambycidae.
