= Haplothrix andamanicus =

Scientific classification
- Kingdom: Animalia
- Phylum: Arthropoda
- Class: Insecta
- Order: Coleoptera
- Suborder: Polyphaga
- Infraorder: Cucujiformia
- Family: Cerambycidae
- Genus: Haplothrix
- Species: H. andamanicus

Binomial name
- Haplothrix andamanicus (Breuning, 1979)

Synonyms
- Haplothrix andamanicus Breuning, 1979 (misspelling)

Species of beetle

Haplothrix andamanicus is a species of beetle in the family Cerambycidae. It was described by Stephan von Breuning in 1979. It is known from the Andaman Islands.
