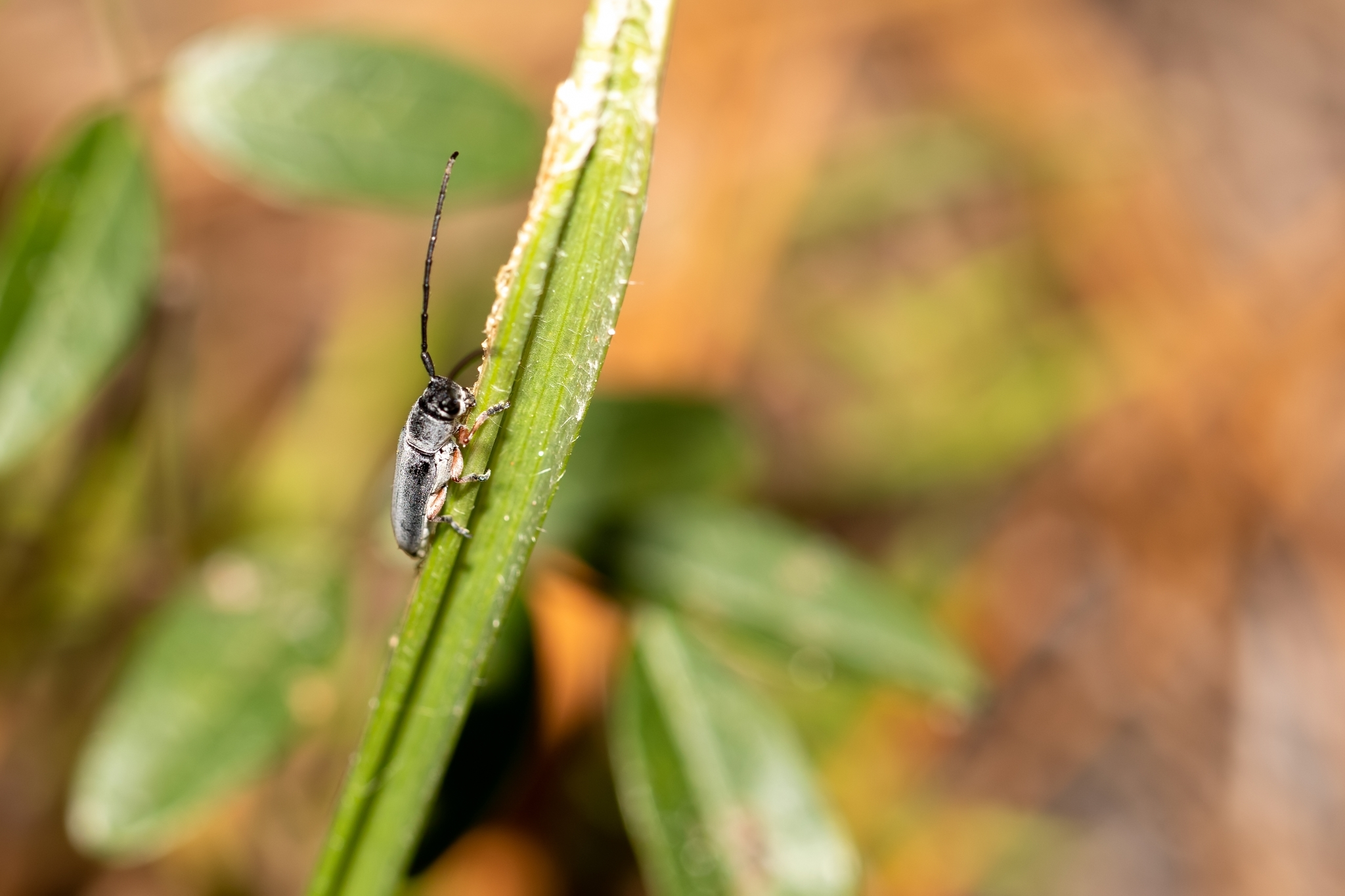
- Mecas femoralis, Florida

Scientific classification
- Domain: Eukaryota
- Kingdom: Animalia
- Phylum: Arthropoda
- Class: Insecta
- Order: Coleoptera
- Suborder: Polyphaga
- Infraorder: Cucujiformia
- Family: Cerambycidae
- Genus: Mecas
- Species: M. femoralis

Binomial name
- Mecas femoralis (Haldeman, 1847)

= Mecas femoralis =

Species of beetle

Mecas femoralis is a species of longhorn beetles found in the southeastern United States. It was described by Haldeman in 1847.

This species can be identified by its small size (6-8 mm), rather uniform pubescence, lack of pronotal calluses, and reddish femora.
