= Malegia =

Scientific classification
- Kingdom: Animalia
- Phylum: Arthropoda
- Clade: Pancrustacea
- Class: Insecta
- Order: Coleoptera
- Suborder: Polyphaga
- Infraorder: Cucujiformia
- Family: Chrysomelidae
- Subfamily: Eumolpinae
- Tribe: Bromiini
- Genus: Malegia; Lefèvre, 1883

Type species
- Malegia letourneuxi Lefèvre, 1883

Genus of leaf beetles from Africa

Malegia is a genus of leaf beetles in the subfamily Eumolpinae. It is known from Africa, Asia and the Caucasus.

== Species ==
- Malegia affinis Jacoby, 1898 – South Africa
- Malegia alluaudi Pic, 1903 – Madagascar
- Malegia arabica Daccordi, 1979 – Saudi Arabia
- Malegia asiatica Pic, 1894 – Iraq, Israel, Jordan
- Malegia atritarsis Pic, 1931 – Angola
- Malegia bicoloripes Pic, 1936 – Vietnam
- Malegia colchica Reitter, 1912 – Azerbaijan, Armenia, Iran, Turkey
- Malegia contracta (Fairmaire, 1886) – Djibouti
- Malegia hauseri Pic, 1902 – Afghanistan
- Malegia laticollis Pic, 1921 – Tanzania
- Malegia latipennis Pic, 1901
- Malegia letourneuxi Lefèvre, 1883 – Egypt, Niger
- Malegia maculata Pic, 1909 – South Africa
- Malegia nigritarsis Pic, 1950 – Niger: Aïr Mountains
- Malegia obscurella Lefèvre, 1883 – Ethiopia
- Malegia olivacea Pic, 1941 (doubtful assignment) – China
- Malegia pallidipes Pic, 1904 – Madagascar
- Malegia robusta Achard, 1914 – Tanzania
- Malegia striatula Lefèvre, 1883 – Tanzania
- Malegia vadoni Pic, 1950

Species moved to other genera:

- Malegia aenea (Chen, 1940): moved to Lahejia
- Malegia brunnea Tan, 1992: moved to Trichotheca
- Malegia jacobsoni Sumakow, 1901: moved to Lahejia
