= Nanohammus =

Scientific classification
- Kingdom: Animalia
- Phylum: Arthropoda
- Class: Insecta
- Order: Coleoptera
- Suborder: Polyphaga
- Infraorder: Cucujiformia
- Family: Cerambycidae
- Tribe: Lamiini
- Genus: Nanohammus

Genus of beetles

Nanohammus is a genus of longhorn beetles of the subfamily Lamiinae, containing the following species:

- Nanohammus aberrans (Gahan, 1894)
- Nanohammus alboplagiatus (Breuning, 1944)
- Nanohammus annulicornis (Pic, 1934)
- Nanohammus grangeri (Breuning, 1962)
- Nanohammus itzingeri (Breuning, 1935)
- Nanohammus myrrhatus (Pascoe, 1878)
- Nanohammus rondoni (Breuning, 1963)
- Nanohammus rufescens (Bates, 1884)
- Nanohammus sinicus (Pic, 1925)
- Nanohammus subfasciatus (Matsushita, 1941)
- Nanohammus taiyal (Gressitt, 1951)
