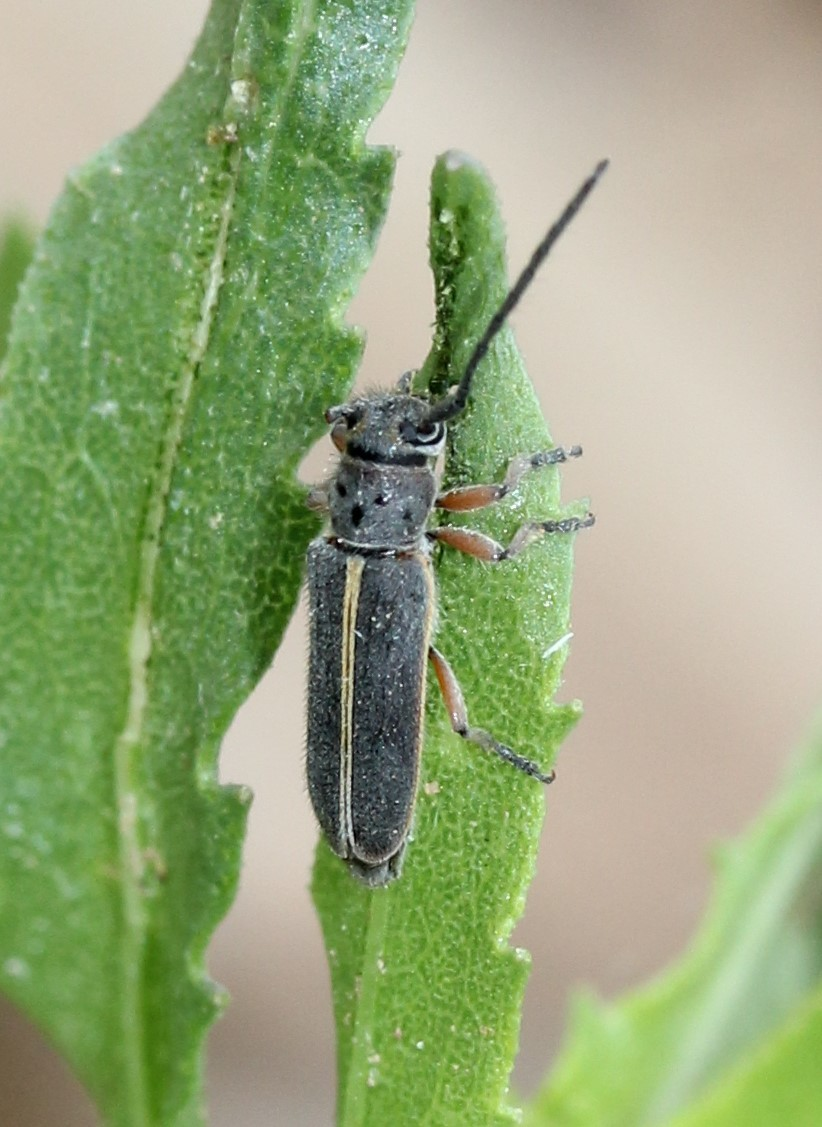
- Mecas pergrata, New Mexico

Scientific classification
- Kingdom: Animalia
- Phylum: Arthropoda
- Class: Insecta
- Order: Coleoptera
- Suborder: Polyphaga
- Infraorder: Cucujiformia
- Family: Cerambycidae
- Genus: Mecas
- Species: M. pergrata

Binomial name
- Mecas pergrata (Say, 1824)

= Mecas pergrata =

Species of beetle

Mecas pergrata is a species of beetle in the family Cerambycidae. It was described by Thomas Say in 1824. It is known from Mexico and the United States.
