= Mecynippus =

Scientific classification
- Kingdom: Animalia
- Phylum: Arthropoda
- Clade: Pancrustacea
- Class: Insecta
- Order: Coleoptera
- Suborder: Polyphaga
- Infraorder: Cucujiformia
- Family: Cerambycidae
- Tribe: Lamiini
- Genus: Mecynippus

Genus of beetles

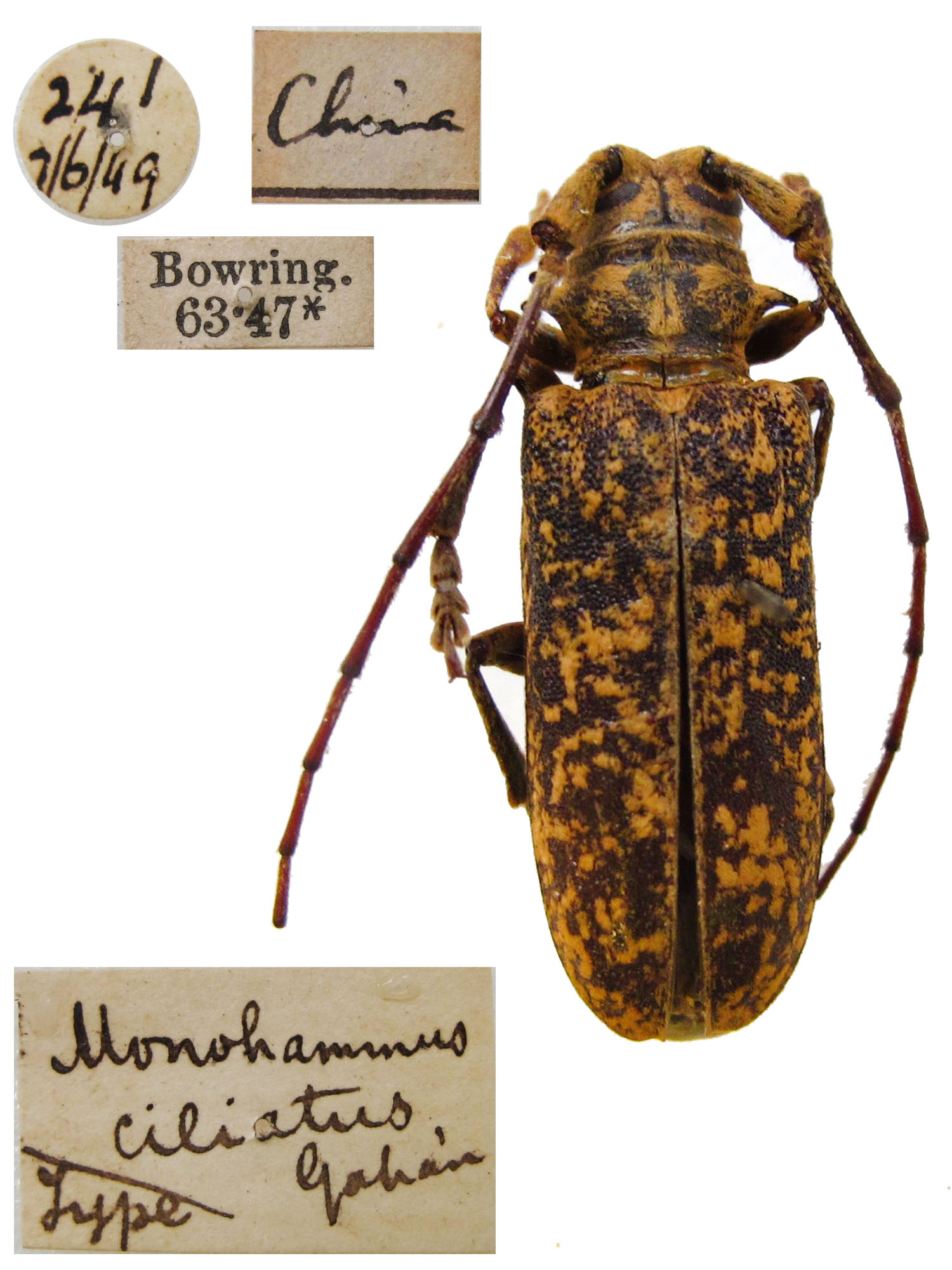
Mecynippus ciliatus (Gahan,1888)

Mecynippus is a genus of longhorn beetles of the subfamily Lamiinae, containing the following species:

- Mecynippus ciliatus (Gahan, 1888)
- Mecynippus pubicornis Bates, 1884
