= Haplothrix pulcher =

Scientific classification
- Kingdom: Animalia
- Phylum: Arthropoda
- Class: Insecta
- Order: Coleoptera
- Suborder: Polyphaga
- Infraorder: Cucujiformia
- Family: Cerambycidae
- Genus: Haplothrix
- Species: H. pulcher

Binomial name
- Haplothrix pulcher (Hüdepohl, 1998)

Synonyms
- Haplothrix pulchra Hüdepohl, 1998

Species of beetle

Haplothrix pulcher is a species of beetle in the family Cerambycidae. It was described by Karl-Ernst Hüdepohl in 1998.

Its type locality is the Crocker Range in Sabah, East Malaysia.
