= Mecas obereoides =

Scientific classification
- Domain: Eukaryota
- Kingdom: Animalia
- Phylum: Arthropoda
- Class: Insecta
- Order: Coleoptera
- Suborder: Polyphaga
- Infraorder: Cucujiformia
- Family: Cerambycidae
- Subfamily: Lamiinae
- Tribe: Saperdini
- Genus: Mecas
- Species: M. obereoides

Binomial name
- Mecas obereoides Bates, 1881

Species of beetle

Mecas obereoides is a species of longhorn beetles found in Mexico and Central America. It was described by Henry Walter Bates in 1881.
