= Icupima ampliata =

Scientific classification
- Kingdom: Animalia
- Phylum: Arthropoda
- Clade: Pancrustacea
- Class: Insecta
- Order: Coleoptera
- Suborder: Polyphaga
- Infraorder: Cucujiformia
- Family: Cerambycidae
- Genus: Icupima
- Species: I. ampliata

Binomial name
- Icupima ampliata Martins, Galileo & Tavakilian, 2008

Species of beetle

Icupima ampliata is a species of beetle in the family Cerambycidae. It was first described by Martins, Galileo and Tavakilian in 2008. It is from French Guiana.
