= Nanohammus myrrhatus =

Scientific classification
- Domain: Eukaryota
- Kingdom: Animalia
- Phylum: Arthropoda
- Class: Insecta
- Order: Coleoptera
- Suborder: Polyphaga
- Infraorder: Cucujiformia
- Family: Cerambycidae
- Tribe: Lamiini
- Genus: Nanohammus
- Species: N. myrrhatus

Binomial name
- Nanohammus myrrhatus (Pascoe, 1878)

Species of beetle

Nanohammus myrrhatus is a species of beetle in the family Cerambycidae. It was described by Francis Polkinghorne Pascoe in 1878.
