= Nanohammus itzingeri =

Scientific classification
- Kingdom: Animalia
- Phylum: Arthropoda
- Class: Insecta
- Order: Coleoptera
- Suborder: Polyphaga
- Infraorder: Cucujiformia
- Family: Cerambycidae
- Genus: Nanohammus
- Species: N. itzingeri

Binomial name
- Nanohammus itzingeri (Breuning, 1935)

Species of beetle

Nanohammus itzingeri is a species of beetle in the family Cerambycidae. It was described by Stephan von Breuning in 1935.
