= Mecas sericea =

Scientific classification
- Domain: Eukaryota
- Kingdom: Animalia
- Phylum: Arthropoda
- Class: Insecta
- Order: Coleoptera
- Suborder: Polyphaga
- Infraorder: Cucujiformia
- Family: Cerambycidae
- Subfamily: Lamiinae
- Tribe: Saperdini
- Genus: Mecas
- Species: M. sericea

Binomial name
- Mecas sericea Thomson, 1864

Species of beetle

Mecas sericea is a species of flat-faced longhorn in the beetle family Cerambycidae. It is found in Mexico.
