= Ochromima megalopoides =

Scientific classification
- Kingdom: Animalia
- Phylum: Arthropoda
- Class: Insecta
- Order: Coleoptera
- Suborder: Polyphaga
- Infraorder: Cucujiformia
- Family: Cerambycidae
- Genus: Ochromima
- Species: O. megalopoides

Binomial name
- Ochromima megalopoides (Bates, 1866)

Species of beetle

Ochromima megalopoides is a species of beetle in the family Cerambycidae. It was described by Henry Walter Bates in 1866. It is known from Brazil, Guyana, Suriname and French Guiana.
