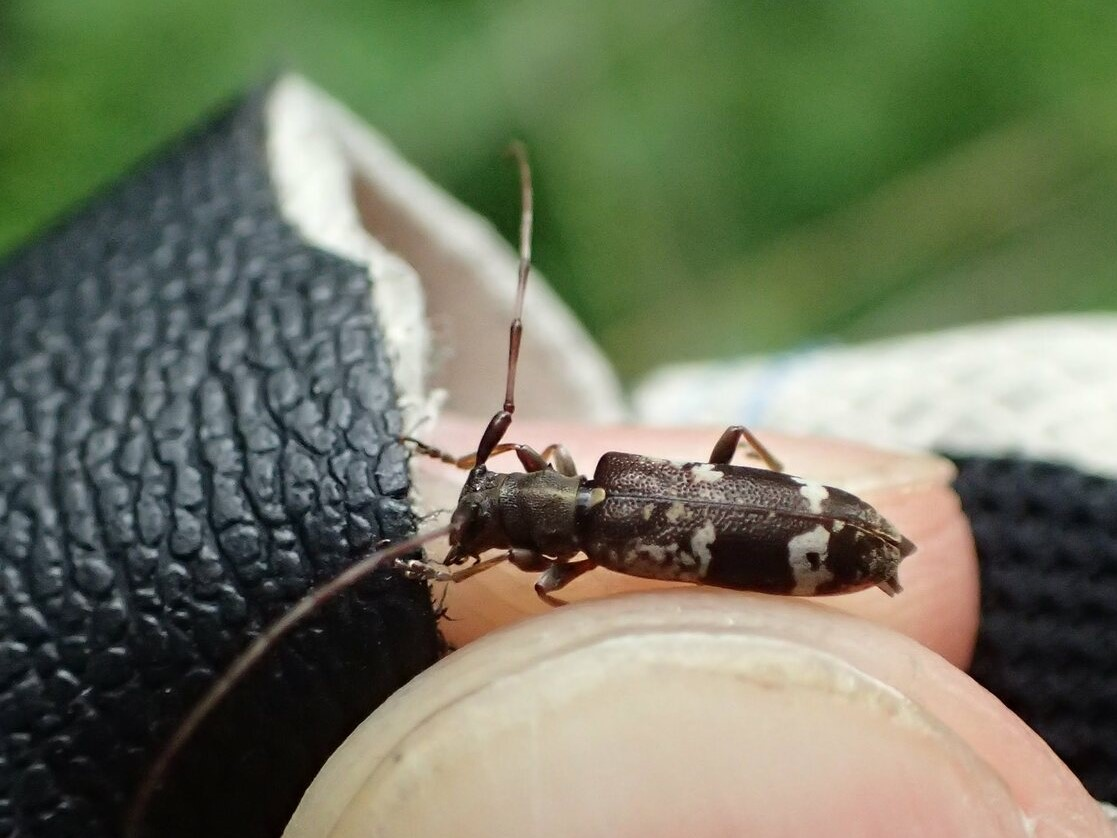

Scientific classification
- Domain: Eukaryota
- Kingdom: Animalia
- Phylum: Arthropoda
- Class: Insecta
- Order: Coleoptera
- Suborder: Polyphaga
- Infraorder: Cucujiformia
- Family: Cerambycidae
- Tribe: Lamiini
- Genus: Nanohammus
- Species: N. rufescens

Binomial name
- Nanohammus rufescens Bates, 1884

= Nanohammus rufescens =

Species of beetle

Nanohammus rufescens is a species of beetle in the family Cerambycidae. It was first described by Henry Walter Bates in 1884. It is known from Japan.
