= Estigmenida =

Scientific classification
- Kingdom: Animalia
- Phylum: Arthropoda
- Class: Insecta
- Order: Coleoptera
- Suborder: Polyphaga
- Infraorder: Cucujiformia
- Family: Cerambycidae
- Tribe: Apomecynini
- Genus: Estigmenida

Genus of beetles

Estigmenida is a genus of beetles in the family Cerambycidae, containing the following species:

- Estigmenida albolineata Breuning, 1940
- Estigmenida robusta Breuning, 1940
- Estigmenida variabilis Gahan, 1895
