= Mexicoscylus =

Scientific classification
- Kingdom: Animalia
- Phylum: Arthropoda
- Class: Insecta
- Order: Coleoptera
- Suborder: Polyphaga
- Infraorder: Cucujiformia
- Family: Cerambycidae
- Tribe: Hemilophini
- Genus: Mexicoscylus

Genus of beetles

Mexicoscylus is a genus of longhorn beetles of the subfamily Lamiinae, containing the following species:

- Mexicoscylus bivittatus (Gahan, 1892)
- Mexicoscylus nigritarse (Galileo & Martins, 2013)
- Mexicoscylus rosae (Martins & Galileo, 2011)
