= Mecas albovitticollis =

Scientific classification
- Kingdom: Animalia
- Phylum: Arthropoda
- Class: Insecta
- Order: Coleoptera
- Suborder: Polyphaga
- Infraorder: Cucujiformia
- Family: Cerambycidae
- Genus: Mecas
- Species: M. albovitticollis

Binomial name
- Mecas albovitticollis Breuning, 1955

Species of beetle

Mecas albovitticollis is a species of longhorn beetles found in Mexico. It was described by Stephan von Breuning in 1955.
