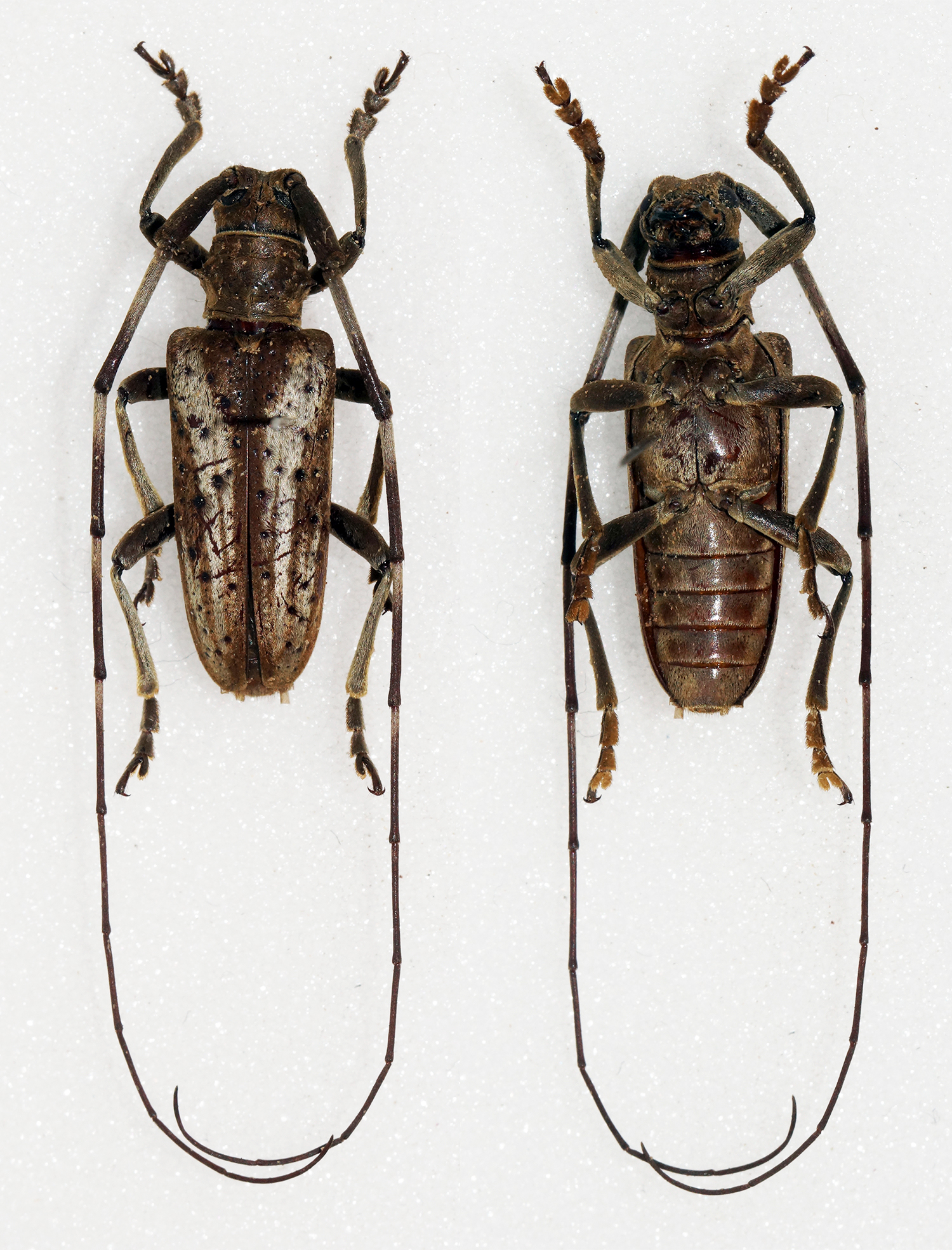
- Haplothrix rivulosus

Scientific classification
- Kingdom: Animalia
- Phylum: Arthropoda
- Class: Insecta
- Order: Coleoptera
- Suborder: Polyphaga
- Infraorder: Cucujiformia
- Family: Cerambycidae
- Tribe: Lamiini
- Genus: Haplothrix; Gahan, 1888

= Haplothrix =

Genus of beetles

Haplothrix is a genus of longhorn beetles of the subfamily Lamiinae, containing the following species:

- Haplothrix amicator (Gahan, 1888)
- Haplothrix andamanicus (Breuning, 1979)
- Haplothrix andrewesi Breuning, 1935
- Haplothrix blairi Breuning, 1935
- Haplothrix fouqueti (Pic, 1932)
- Haplothrix griseatus (Gahan, 1888)
- Haplothrix paramicator Breuning, 1965
- Haplothrix pulcher (Hüdepohl, 1998)
- Haplothrix rivulosus (Gahan, 1888)
- Haplothrix simplex Gahan, 1888
- Haplothrix strandi Breuning, 1935
