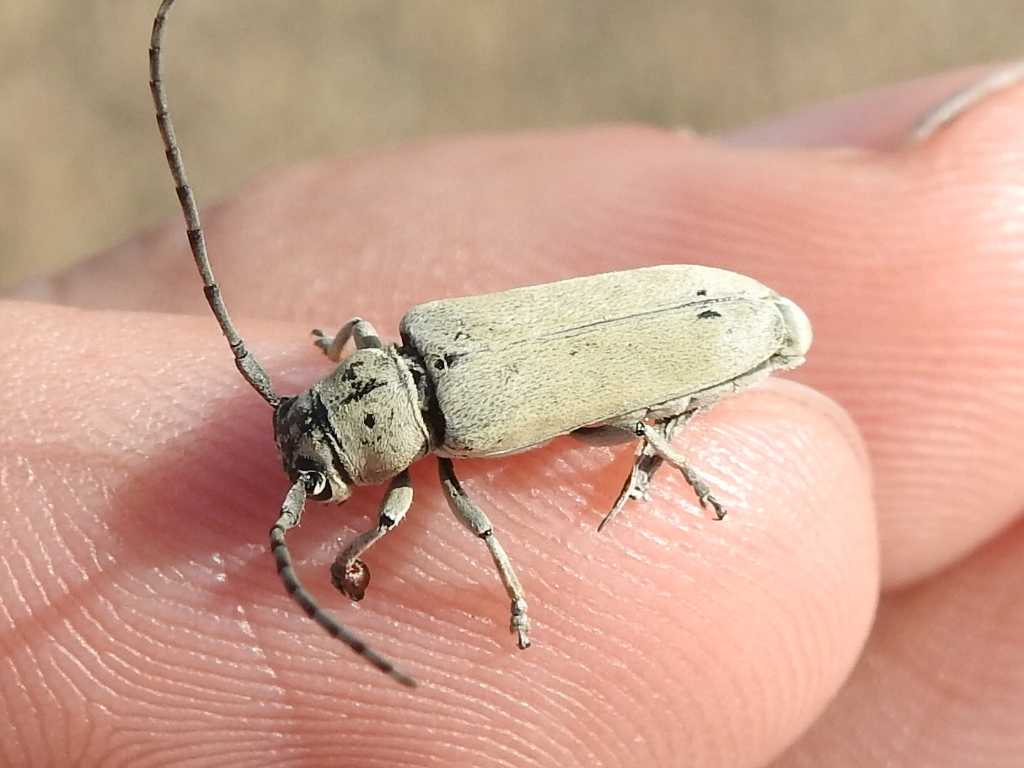
- Mecas cana, Texas

Scientific classification
- Kingdom: Animalia
- Phylum: Arthropoda
- Class: Insecta
- Order: Coleoptera
- Suborder: Polyphaga
- Infraorder: Cucujiformia
- Family: Cerambycidae
- Subfamily: Lamiinae
- Tribe: Saperdini
- Genus: Mecas; LeConte, 1852

= Mecas =

Genus of beetles

Mecas is a genus of longhorn beetles found in North America, containing the following species:

subgenus Dylobolus

- Mecas rotundicollis (Thomson, 1868)

subgenus Mecas

- Mecas albovitticollis Breuning, 1955
- Mecas ambigena Bates, 1881
- Mecas bicallosa Martin, 1924
- Mecas cana (Newman, 1840)
- Mecas cineracea Casey, 1913
- Mecas cinerea (Newman, 1840)
- Mecas cirrosa Chemsak & Linsley, 1973
- Mecas confusa Chemsak & Linsley, 1973
- Mecas femoralis (Haldeman, 1847)
- Mecas humeralis Chemsak & Linsley, 1973
- Mecas linsleyi Knull, 1947
- Mecas marginella LeConte, 1873
- Mecas marmorata Gahan, 1892
- Mecas menthae Chemsak & Linsley, 1973
- Mecas obereoides Bates, 1881
- Mecas pergrata (Say, 1824)

subgenus Pannychis

- Mecas sericea (Thomson, 1864)
