= Malegia letourneuxi =

Scientific classification
- Kingdom: Animalia
- Phylum: Arthropoda
- Clade: Pancrustacea
- Class: Insecta
- Order: Coleoptera
- Suborder: Polyphaga
- Infraorder: Cucujiformia
- Family: Chrysomelidae
- Genus: Malegia
- Species: M. letourneuxi

Binomial name
- Malegia letourneuxi Lefèvre, 1883

Species of beetle

Malegia letourneuxi is a species of leaf beetle of Egypt, described by Édouard Lefèvre in 1883. It was discovered in Shubra (a district of Cairo) by Aristide Letourneux.
