= Mecas confusa =

Scientific classification
- Domain: Eukaryota
- Kingdom: Animalia
- Phylum: Arthropoda
- Class: Insecta
- Order: Coleoptera
- Suborder: Polyphaga
- Infraorder: Cucujiformia
- Family: Cerambycidae
- Subfamily: Lamiinae
- Tribe: Saperdini
- Genus: Mecas
- Species: M. confusa

Binomial name
- Mecas confusa Chemsak & Linsley, 1973

Species of beetle

Mecas confusa is a species of longhorned beetles found in the United States and Mexico. It was described by Chemsak and Linsley in 1973.
