= Nanohammus sinicus =

Scientific classification
- Kingdom: Animalia
- Phylum: Arthropoda
- Class: Insecta
- Order: Coleoptera
- Suborder: Polyphaga
- Infraorder: Cucujiformia
- Family: Cerambycidae
- Genus: Nanohammus
- Species: N. sinicus

Binomial name
- Nanohammus sinicus (Pic, 1925)

Synonyms
- Orsidis sinica Pic, 1925; Rhodopina sinica (Pic, 1925); Rhodopina strandi (Breuning, 1935); Rhodopis sinica (Pic, 1925); Rhodopis strandi Breuning, 1935

Species of beetle

Nanohammus sinicus is a species of beetle in the family Cerambycidae. It was described by Maurice Pic in 1925. It is known from China.
