= Haplothrix fouqueti =

Scientific classification
- Kingdom: Animalia
- Phylum: Arthropoda
- Class: Insecta
- Order: Coleoptera
- Suborder: Polyphaga
- Infraorder: Cucujiformia
- Family: Cerambycidae
- Genus: Haplothrix
- Species: H. fouqueti

Binomial name
- Haplothrix fouqueti (Pic, 1932)

Synonyms
- Uraecha fouqueti Pic, 1932

Species of beetle

Haplothrix fouqueti is a species of beetle in the family Cerambycidae. It was described by Maurice Pic in 1932.
