= Epectasis panamensis =

Scientific classification
- Kingdom: Animalia
- Phylum: Arthropoda
- Class: Insecta
- Order: Coleoptera
- Suborder: Polyphaga
- Infraorder: Cucujiformia
- Family: Cerambycidae
- Genus: Epectasis
- Species: E. panamensis

Binomial name
- Epectasis panamensis Breuning, 1974

Species of beetle

Epectasis panamensis is a species of beetle in the family Cerambycidae. It was described by Stephan von Breuning in 1974. It is known from Panama.
