= Leuronotus =

Scientific classification
- Kingdom: Animalia
- Phylum: Arthropoda
- Class: Insecta
- Order: Coleoptera
- Suborder: Polyphaga
- Infraorder: Cucujiformia
- Family: Cerambycidae
- Tribe: Lamiini
- Genus: Leuronotus

Genus of beetles

Leuronotus is a genus of longhorn beetles of the subfamily Lamiinae, containing the following species:

- Leuronotus affinis Breuning, 1970.
- Leuronotus spatulatus Gahan, 1888.
