= Mecas cinerea =

Scientific classification
- Domain: Eukaryota
- Kingdom: Animalia
- Phylum: Arthropoda
- Class: Insecta
- Order: Coleoptera
- Suborder: Polyphaga
- Infraorder: Cucujiformia
- Family: Cerambycidae
- Subfamily: Lamiinae
- Tribe: Saperdini
- Genus: Mecas
- Species: M. cinerea

Binomial name
- Mecas cinerea (Newman, 1840)

Species of beetle

Mecas cinerea is a species of flat-faced longhorn in the beetle family Cerambycidae. It is found in Mexico.
