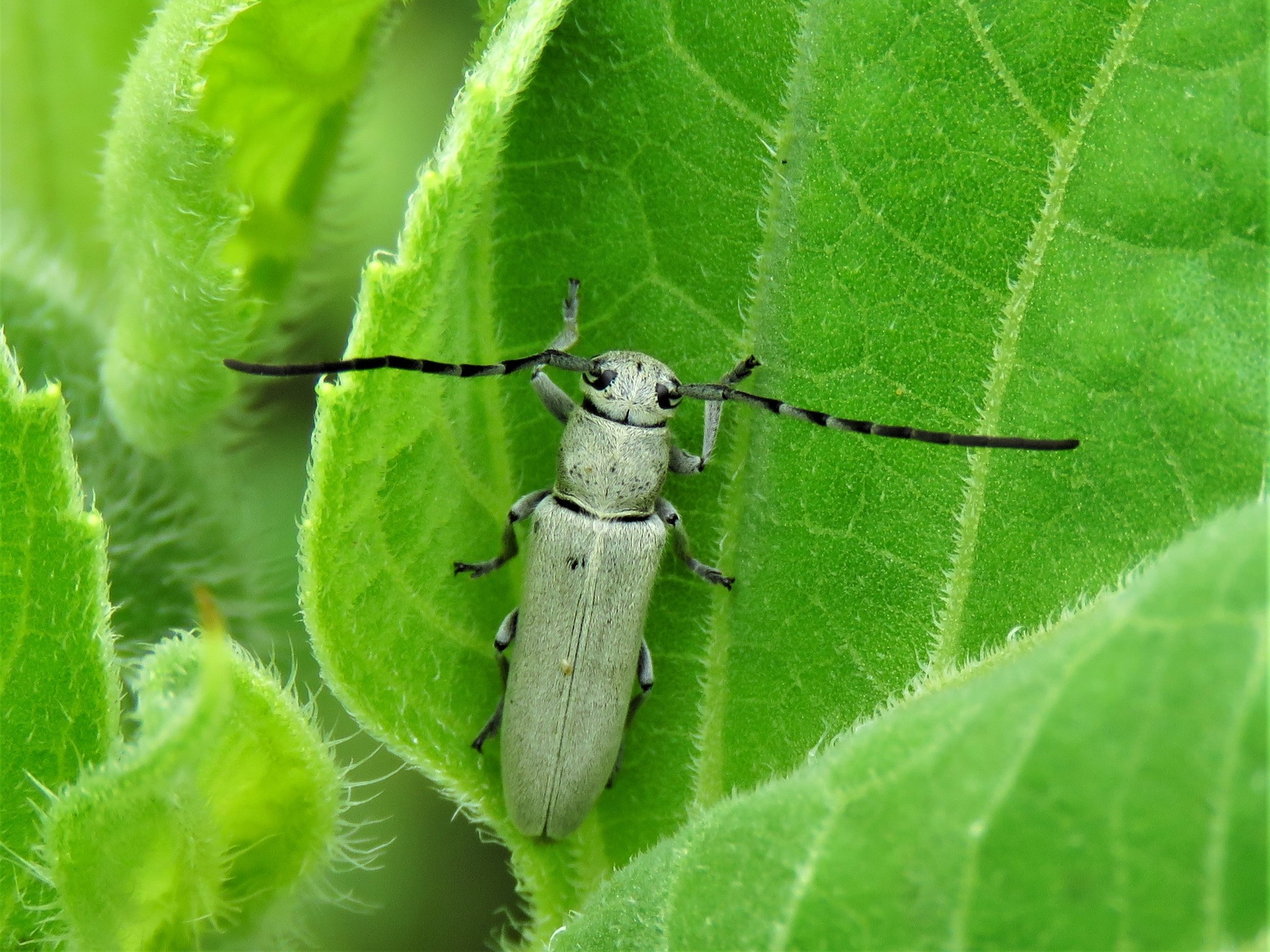
- Mecas cineracea, Texas

Scientific classification
- Kingdom: Animalia
- Phylum: Arthropoda
- Class: Insecta
- Order: Coleoptera
- Suborder: Polyphaga
- Infraorder: Cucujiformia
- Family: Cerambycidae
- Subfamily: Lamiinae
- Tribe: Saperdini
- Genus: Mecas
- Species: M. cineracea

Binomial name
- Mecas cineracea Casey, 1913

= Mecas cineracea =

Species of beetle

Mecas cineracea is a species of longhorn beetles found in the southeastern United States and Mexico. It was described by Thomas Lincoln Casey, Jr. in 1913.
