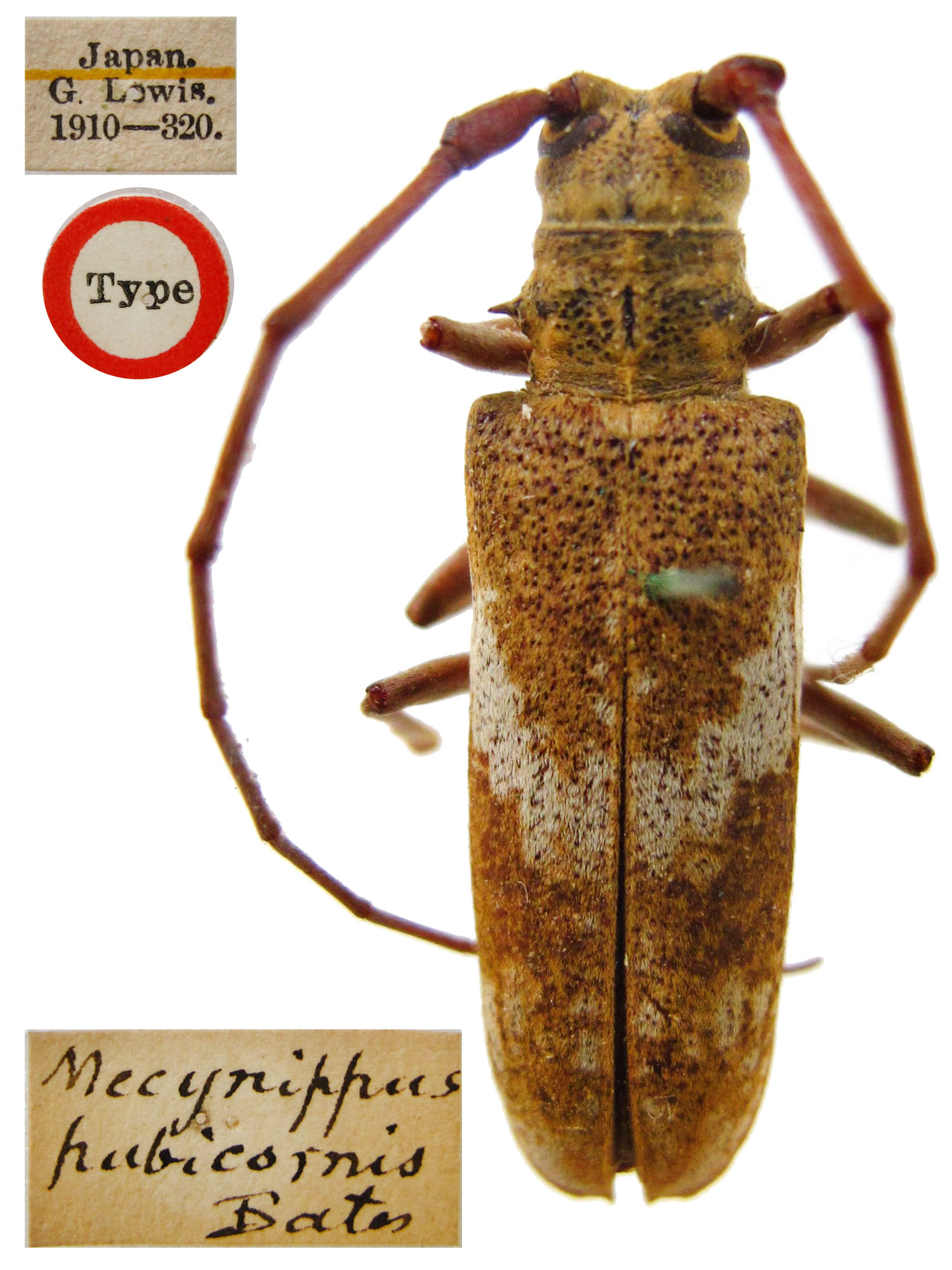
- Mecynippus pubicornis beetle

Scientific classification
- Kingdom: Animalia
- Phylum: Arthropoda
- Class: Insecta
- Order: Coleoptera
- Suborder: Polyphaga
- Infraorder: Cucujiformia
- Family: Cerambycidae
- Genus: Mecynippus
- Species: M. pubicornis

Binomial name
- Mecynippus pubicornis Bates, 1884

= Mecynippus pubicornis =

Species of beetle

Mecynippus pubicornis is a species of beetle in the family Cerambycidae. It was described by Henry Walter Bates in 1884. It is known from Japan.
