= Haplothrix blairi =

Scientific classification
- Kingdom: Animalia
- Phylum: Arthropoda
- Class: Insecta
- Order: Coleoptera
- Suborder: Polyphaga
- Infraorder: Cucujiformia
- Family: Cerambycidae
- Genus: Haplothrix
- Species: H. blairi

Binomial name
- Haplothrix blairi Breuning, 1935

Synonyms
- Hoplothrix blairi Breuning, 1935 (misspelling)

Species of beetle

Haplothrix blairi is a species of beetle in the family Cerambycidae. It was described by Stephan von Breuning in 1935, originally misspelled as Hoplothrix blairi. It is known from Thailand, Myanmar, Laos, and Vietnam.
