= Mecas ambigena =

Scientific classification
- Kingdom: Animalia
- Phylum: Arthropoda
- Class: Insecta
- Order: Coleoptera
- Suborder: Polyphaga
- Infraorder: Cucujiformia
- Family: Cerambycidae
- Genus: Mecas
- Species: M. ambigena

Binomial name
- Mecas ambigena Bates, 1881

Species of beetle

Mecas ambigena is a species of longhorn beetles found in Mexico. It was described by Henry Walter Bates in 1881.
