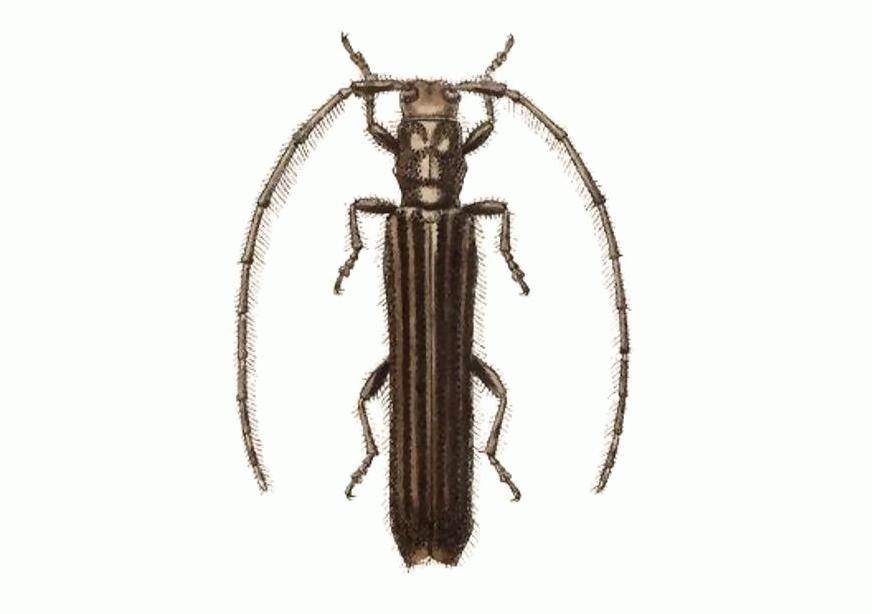

Scientific classification
- Kingdom: Animalia
- Phylum: Arthropoda
- Clade: Pancrustacea
- Class: Insecta
- Order: Coleoptera
- Suborder: Polyphaga
- Infraorder: Cucujiformia
- Family: Cerambycidae
- Tribe: Pteropliini
- Genus: Epectasis; Bates, 1866

= Epectasis =

Genus of beetles

Epectasis is a genus of longhorn beetles of the subfamily Lamiinae, containing the following species:

- Epectasis hiekei Breuning, 1974
- Epectasis juncea (Newman, 1840)
- Epectasis junceoides Breuning, 1961
- Epectasis mexicana Breuning, 1954
- Epectasis panamensis Breuning, 1974
- Epectasis rotundipennis Breuning, 1943
- Epectasis similis Gahan, 1895
