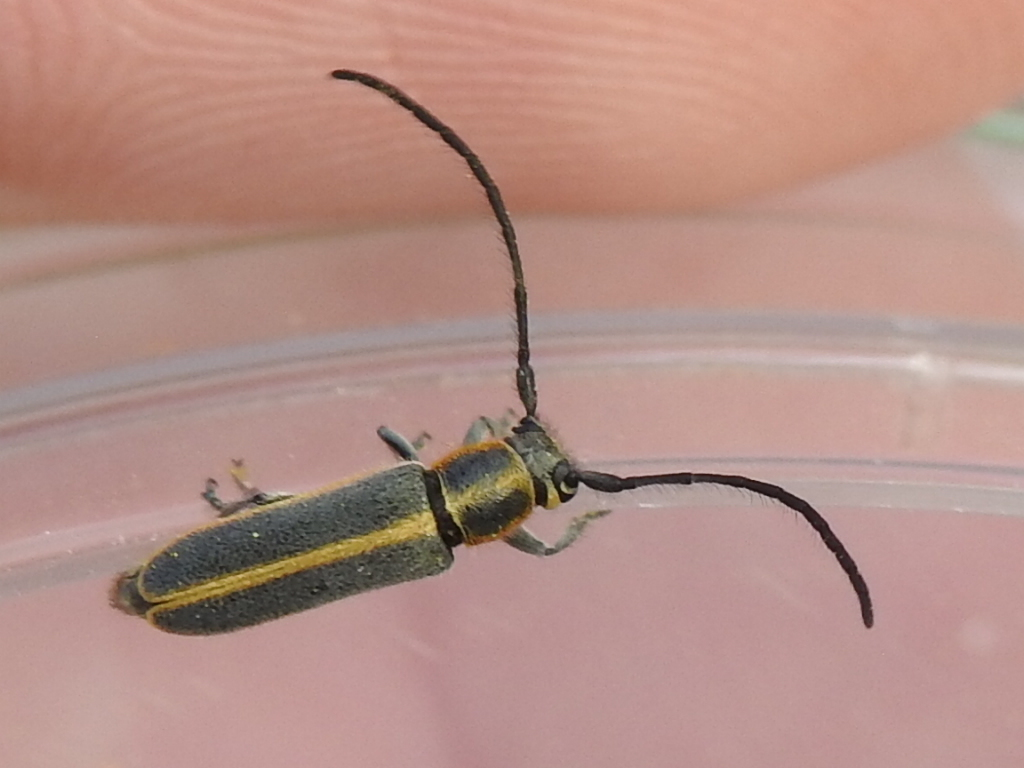
- Mecas marginella, Texas

Scientific classification
- Domain: Eukaryota
- Kingdom: Animalia
- Phylum: Arthropoda
- Class: Insecta
- Order: Coleoptera
- Suborder: Polyphaga
- Infraorder: Cucujiformia
- Family: Cerambycidae
- Subfamily: Lamiinae
- Tribe: Saperdini
- Genus: Mecas
- Species: M. marginella

Binomial name
- Mecas marginella LeConte, 1873

= Mecas marginella =

Species of beetle

Mecas marginella is a species of longhorn beetles found in the United States. It was described by John Lawrence LeConte in 1873.
