= Malegia arabica =

Scientific classification
- Kingdom: Animalia
- Phylum: Arthropoda
- Clade: Pancrustacea
- Class: Insecta
- Order: Coleoptera
- Suborder: Polyphaga
- Infraorder: Cucujiformia
- Family: Chrysomelidae
- Genus: Malegia
- Species: M. arabica

Binomial name
- Malegia arabica Daccordi, 1979

Species of beetle

Malegia arabica is a species of leaf beetle of Saudi Arabia.
