= Nanohammus subfasciatus =

Scientific classification
- Kingdom: Animalia
- Phylum: Arthropoda
- Class: Insecta
- Order: Coleoptera
- Suborder: Polyphaga
- Infraorder: Cucujiformia
- Family: Cerambycidae
- Genus: Nanohammus
- Species: N. subfasciatus

Binomial name
- Nanohammus subfasciatus (Matsushita, 1941)

Synonyms
- Rarasanus subfasciatus Matsushita, 1941

Species of beetle

Nanohammus subfasciatus is a species of beetle in the family Cerambycidae. It was described by Masaki Matsushita in 1941. It is found in Taiwan and Japan.
