= Ochromima pallipes =

Scientific classification
- Kingdom: Animalia
- Phylum: Arthropoda
- Clade: Pancrustacea
- Class: Insecta
- Order: Coleoptera
- Suborder: Polyphaga
- Infraorder: Cucujiformia
- Family: Cerambycidae
- Genus: Ochromima
- Species: O. pallipes

Binomial name
- Ochromima pallipes (Olivier, 1795)

Species of beetle

Ochromima pallipes is a species of beetle in the family Cerambycidae. It was described by Guillaume-Antoine Olivier in 1795. It is known from French Guiana and Suriname. There are no catalogued subspecies
