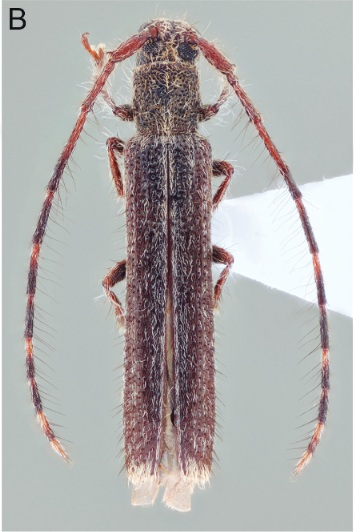

Scientific classification
- Kingdom: Animalia
- Phylum: Arthropoda
- Clade: Pancrustacea
- Class: Insecta
- Order: Coleoptera
- Suborder: Polyphaga
- Infraorder: Cucujiformia
- Family: Cerambycidae
- Genus: Epectasis
- Species: E. juncea

Binomial name
- Epectasis juncea (Newman, 1840)

Synonyms
- Epectasis attenuata Bates, 1866; Epectasis grossepunctata Breuning, 1942; Saperda juncea Newman, 1840

= Epectasis juncea =

Species of beetle

Epectasis juncea is a species of beetle in the family Cerambycidae, and the type species of its genus. It was described by Newman in 1840, originally under the genus Saperda. It has a wide distribution between Central and South America, with records from Mexico (Veracruz), Guatemala, Nicaragua (Chontales, Matagalpa), Honduras, Costa Rica (Alajuela, Guanacaste, Puntarenas), Panama (Panama, Colón, Bocas del Toro, Chriquí, Panama Oeste), Ecuador, French Guiana, Brazil (Amazonas, Mato Grosso, Bahia, Minas Gerais, Rio de Janeiro, São Paulo, Paraná), Peru and Bolivia (Santa Cruz).
