= Mexicoscylus nigritarse =

Scientific classification
- Kingdom: Animalia
- Phylum: Arthropoda
- Class: Insecta
- Order: Coleoptera
- Suborder: Polyphaga
- Infraorder: Cucujiformia
- Family: Cerambycidae
- Genus: Mexicoscylus
- Species: M. nigritarse

Binomial name
- Mexicoscylus nigritarse Galileo & Martins, 2013

Species of beetle

Mexicoscylus nigritarse is a species of beetle in the family Cerambycidae. It was described by Galileo and Martins in 2013. It is known from Costa Rica.
