= Pseudotaxalus =

Scientific classification
- Domain: Eukaryota
- Kingdom: Animalia
- Phylum: Arthropoda
- Class: Insecta
- Order: Coleoptera
- Suborder: Polyphaga
- Infraorder: Cucujiformia
- Family: Cerambycidae
- Subfamily: Lamiinae
- Genus: Pseudotaxalus

Genus of beetles

Pseudotaxalus is a genus of longhorn beetles of the subfamily Lamiinae, containing the following species:

- Pseudotaxalus alboguttatus Breuning, 1939
- Pseudotaxalus angustus (Gahan, 1894)
