= Haplothrix strandi =

Scientific classification
- Kingdom: Animalia
- Phylum: Arthropoda
- Class: Insecta
- Order: Coleoptera
- Suborder: Polyphaga
- Infraorder: Cucujiformia
- Family: Cerambycidae
- Genus: Haplothrix
- Species: H. strandi

Binomial name
- Haplothrix strandi Breuning, 1935

Synonyms
- Hoplothrix strandi Breuning, 1935 (misspelling)

Species of beetle

Haplothrix strandi is a species of beetle in the family Cerambycidae. It was described by Stephan von Breuning in 1935, originally misspelled as Hoplothrix strandi.
