= Mecas linsleyi =

Scientific classification
- Domain: Eukaryota
- Kingdom: Animalia
- Phylum: Arthropoda
- Class: Insecta
- Order: Coleoptera
- Suborder: Polyphaga
- Infraorder: Cucujiformia
- Family: Cerambycidae
- Subfamily: Lamiinae
- Tribe: Saperdini
- Genus: Mecas
- Species: M. linsleyi

Binomial name
- Mecas linsleyi Knull, 1975

Species of beetle

Mecas linsleyi is a species of longhorn beetles found in North America. It was described by Knull in 1947.
