= Icupima =

Scientific classification
- Kingdom: Animalia
- Phylum: Arthropoda
- Class: Insecta
- Order: Coleoptera
- Suborder: Polyphaga
- Infraorder: Cucujiformia
- Family: Cerambycidae
- Subfamily: Lamiinae
- Tribe: Hemilophini
- Genus: Icupima; Martins & Galileo, 1991

Genus of beetles

Icupima is a genus of longhorn beetles of the subfamily Lamiinae, containing the following species:

- Icupima ampliata Martins, Galileo & Tavakilian, 2008
- Icupima laevipennis (Gahan, 1892)
- Icupima taua Martins & Galileo, 2004
