= Haplothrix paramicator =

Scientific classification
- Kingdom: Animalia
- Phylum: Arthropoda
- Class: Insecta
- Order: Coleoptera
- Suborder: Polyphaga
- Infraorder: Cucujiformia
- Family: Cerambycidae
- Genus: Haplothrix
- Species: H. paramicator

Binomial name
- Haplothrix paramicator Breuning, 1965

Synonyms
- Hoplothrix paramicator Breuning, 1965 (misspelling)

Species of beetle

Haplothrix paramicator is a species of beetle in the family Cerambycidae. It was described by Stephan von Breuning in 1965. It is known from India.
