= Nanohammus annulicornis =

Scientific classification
- Kingdom: Animalia
- Phylum: Arthropoda
- Class: Insecta
- Order: Coleoptera
- Suborder: Polyphaga
- Infraorder: Cucujiformia
- Family: Cerambycidae
- Genus: Nanohammus
- Species: N. annulicornis

Binomial name
- Nanohammus annulicornis (Pic, 1934)

Synonyms
- Pararhodopis strandiella Breuning, 1935

Species of beetle

Nanohammus annulicornis is a species of beetle in the family Cerambycidae. It was described by Maurice Pic in 1934.
