= Epectasis hiekei =

Scientific classification
- Kingdom: Animalia
- Phylum: Arthropoda
- Class: Insecta
- Order: Coleoptera
- Suborder: Polyphaga
- Infraorder: Cucujiformia
- Family: Cerambycidae
- Genus: Epectasis
- Species: E. hiekei

Binomial name
- Epectasis hiekei Breuning, 1974

Species of beetle

Epectasis hiekei is a species of beetle in the family Cerambycidae. It was described by Stephan von Breuning in 1974. It is known from Honduras and Mexico.
