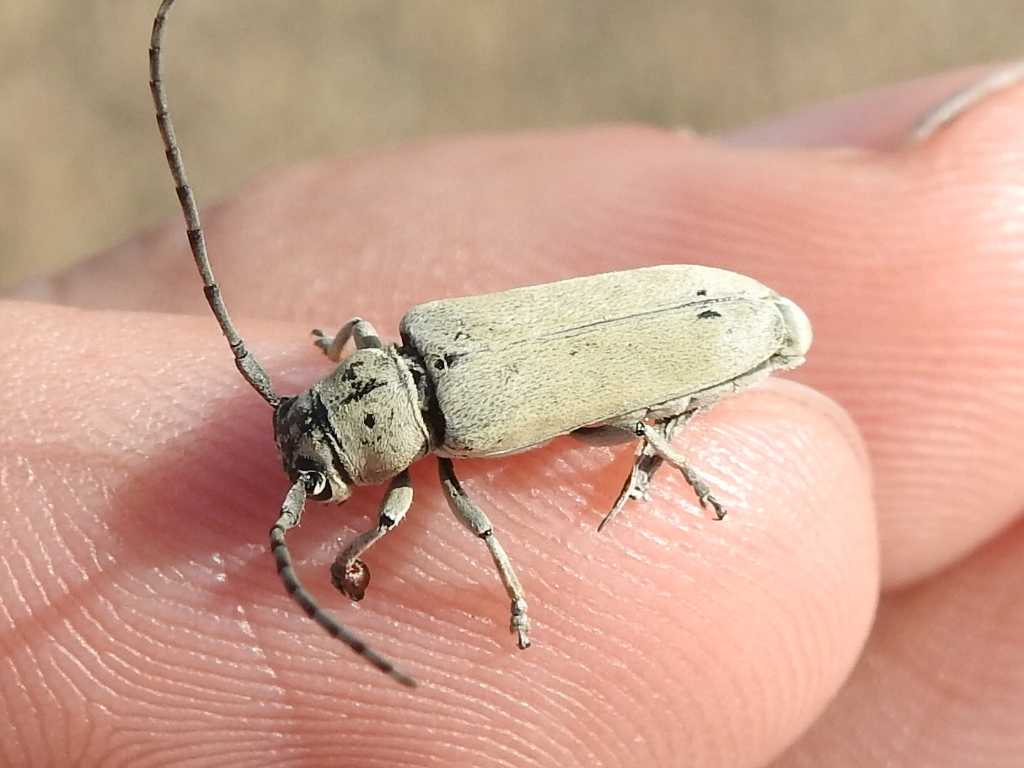
- Mecas cana, Texas

Scientific classification
- Domain: Eukaryota
- Kingdom: Animalia
- Phylum: Arthropoda
- Class: Insecta
- Order: Coleoptera
- Suborder: Polyphaga
- Infraorder: Cucujiformia
- Family: Cerambycidae
- Subfamily: Lamiinae
- Tribe: Saperdini
- Genus: Mecas
- Species: M. cana

Binomial name
- Mecas cana (Newman, 1840)

= Mecas cana =

Species of beetle

Mecas cana is a species of longhorn beetles found in North America. It was described by Newman in 1840.

== Subspecies ==
- Mecas cana saturnina (LeConte, 1859)
- Mecas cana cana (Newman, 1840)
