= Charles Joseph Gahan =

Irish entomologist (1862-1939)

Charles Joseph Gahan (20 January 1862 – 21 January 1939) was an Irish entomologist who specialized in beetles, particularly the Cerambycidae. He served as keeper at the department of entomology in the British Museum (Natural History) for thirteen years after Charles Owen Waterhouse.

He was born at Roscrea, County Tipperary, Ireland. His father, Michael Gahan was the Master of Erasmus Smith's School in Tipperary. He was educated first at Queens College Galway, where he achieved distinction, and then at the Royal School of Mines in Kensington. In 1882 he was awarded a medal and prizes as the best biological student of the session. In 1886, he joined the British Museum (Natural History) as an assistant in the Department of Zoology where he became Keeper in the then newly formed Department of Entomology in 1913. An expert on beetles, especially Cerambycidae, he wrote the 1906 volume of The Fauna of British India, Including Ceylon and Burma on that group. Gahan served as honorary Secretary of the Entomological Society of London in 1899-1900 and was president from 1917–1918. He married Annie Woodward in 1887. Gahan retired in 1920 and lived at Mouth Aylsham in Norfolk and died at Aylsham.
