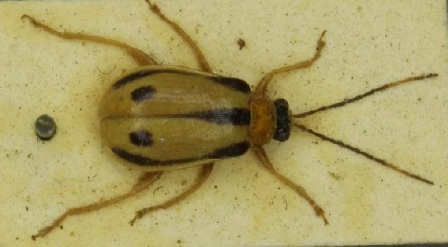

Scientific classification
- Kingdom: Animalia
- Phylum: Arthropoda
- Clade: Pancrustacea
- Class: Insecta
- Order: Coleoptera
- Suborder: Polyphaga
- Infraorder: Cucujiformia
- Family: Chrysomelidae
- Genus: Aristobrotica
- Species: A. zelota

Binomial name
- Aristobrotica zelota (Gahan, 1891)

Synonyms
- Diabrotica zelota Gahan, 1891

= Aristobrotica zelota =

Species of beetle

Aristobrotica zelota is a species of beetle of the family Chrysomelidae. It is found in Minas Gerais and Rio de Janeiro, Brazil.
