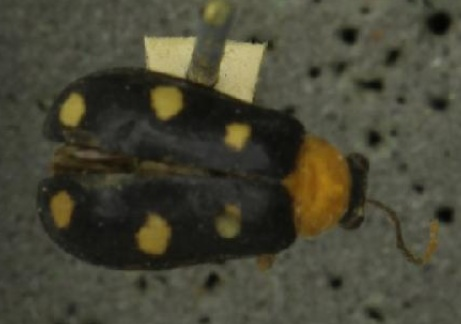

Scientific classification
- Kingdom: Animalia
- Phylum: Arthropoda
- Clade: Pancrustacea
- Class: Insecta
- Order: Coleoptera
- Suborder: Polyphaga
- Infraorder: Cucujiformia
- Family: Chrysomelidae
- Genus: Aristobrotica
- Species: A. conformis

Binomial name
- Aristobrotica conformis (Gahan, 1891)

Synonyms
- Diabrotica conformis Gahan, 1891

= Aristobrotica conformis =

Species of beetle

Aristobrotica conformis is a species of beetle of the family Chrysomelidae. It is found in Colombia, French Guiana, and Brazil (Amazonas and Pará).
