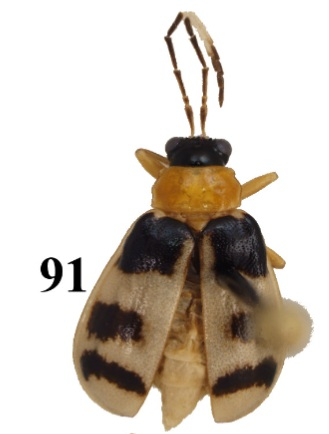
- Aristobrotica allardi

Scientific classification
- Kingdom: Animalia
- Phylum: Arthropoda
- Clade: Pancrustacea
- Class: Insecta
- Order: Coleoptera
- Suborder: Polyphaga
- Infraorder: Cucujiformia
- Family: Chrysomelidae
- Tribe: Luperini
- Subtribe: Diabroticina
- Genus: Aristobrotica; Bechyné, 1956

Type species
- Galeruca decemguttata Olivier, 1808

= Aristobrotica =

Genus of leaf beetles

Aristobrotica is a genus of beetles belonging to the family Chrysomelidae. The genus primarily occurs in northern South America, with one species (Aristobrotica allardi) being found in Panama.

== Species ==
There are 17 recognized species:

- Aristobrotica allardi (Jacoby, 1887)
- Aristobrotica angulicollis (Erichson, 1878)
- Aristobrotica belemea (Gahan, 1891)
- Aristobrotica capillosa Moura, 2011
- Aristobrotica conformis (Gahan, 1891)
- Aristobrotica delecta (Gahan, 1891)
- Aristobrotica discreta (Weise, 1921)
- Aristobrotica excisa (Weise, 1921)
- Aristobrotica flavonotata (Jacoby, 1880)
- Aristobrotica marginipennis (Gahan, 1891)
- Aristobrotica mirapeua Moura, 1997
- Aristobrotica nigrovittulata (Baly, 1886)
- Aristobrotica paraensis (Baly, 1886)
- Aristobrotica proba (Weise, 1921)
- Aristobrotica spectabilis (Baly, 1891)
- Aristobrotica steinheili (Baly, 1886)
- Aristobrotica zelota (Gahan, 1891)
