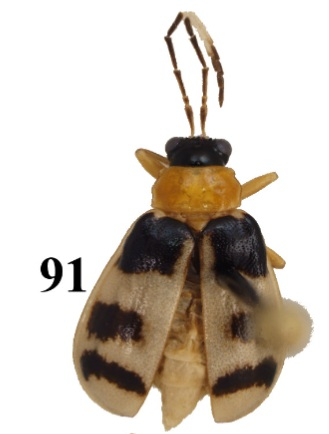
- Aristobrotica allardi

Scientific classification
- Kingdom: Animalia
- Phylum: Arthropoda
- Clade: Pancrustacea
- Class: Insecta
- Order: Coleoptera
- Suborder: Polyphaga
- Infraorder: Cucujiformia
- Family: Chrysomelidae
- Genus: Aristobrotica
- Species: A. allardi

Binomial name
- Aristobrotica allardi (Jacoby, 1887)

Synonyms
- Diabrotica allardi Jacoby, 1887

= Aristobrotica allardi =

Species of beetle

Aristobrotica allardi is a species of beetle of the family Chrysomelidae. It is endemic to Panama.
