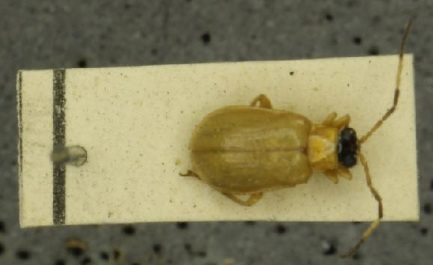

Scientific classification
- Kingdom: Animalia
- Phylum: Arthropoda
- Clade: Pancrustacea
- Class: Insecta
- Order: Coleoptera
- Suborder: Polyphaga
- Infraorder: Cucujiformia
- Family: Chrysomelidae
- Genus: Aristobrotica
- Species: A. paraensis

Binomial name
- Aristobrotica paraensis (Baly, 1886)

Synonyms
- Diabrotica paraensis Baly, 1886

= Aristobrotica paraensis =

Species of beetle

Aristobrotica paraensis is a species of beetle of the family Chrysomelidae. It is found in Amazonas and Pará, Brazil.
