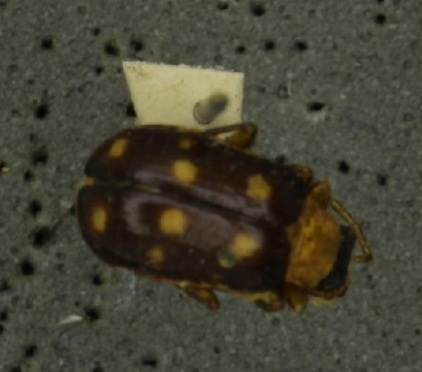

Scientific classification
- Kingdom: Animalia
- Phylum: Arthropoda
- Clade: Pancrustacea
- Class: Insecta
- Order: Coleoptera
- Suborder: Polyphaga
- Infraorder: Cucujiformia
- Family: Chrysomelidae
- Genus: Aristobrotica
- Species: A. angulicollis

Binomial name
- Aristobrotica angulicollis (Erichson, 1848)

Synonyms
- Diabrotica angulicollis Erichson, 1848; Galeruca decemguttata Olivier, 1808

= Aristobrotica angulicollis =

Species of beetle

Aristobrotica angulicollis is a species of beetle of the family Chrysomelidae. It is found in Guyana, Suriname, French Guiana, Bolivia, Peru, and Brazil (Amapá, Amazonas, Pará, Maranhão, Ceará, and Bahia).
