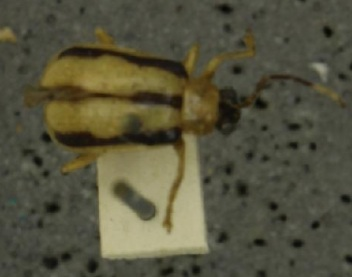

Scientific classification
- Kingdom: Animalia
- Phylum: Arthropoda
- Clade: Pancrustacea
- Class: Insecta
- Order: Coleoptera
- Suborder: Polyphaga
- Infraorder: Cucujiformia
- Family: Chrysomelidae
- Genus: Aristobrotica
- Species: A. nigrovittulata

Binomial name
- Aristobrotica nigrovittulata (Baly, 1886)

Synonyms
- Diabrotica nigrovittulata Baly, 1886

= Aristobrotica nigrovittulata =

Species of beetle

Aristobrotica nigrovittulata is a species of beetle of the family Chrysomelidae. It is found in Colombia, Venezuela, and Brazil.
