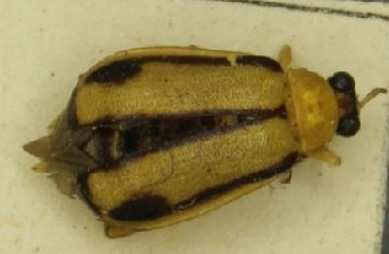

Scientific classification
- Kingdom: Animalia
- Phylum: Arthropoda
- Clade: Pancrustacea
- Class: Insecta
- Order: Coleoptera
- Suborder: Polyphaga
- Infraorder: Cucujiformia
- Family: Chrysomelidae
- Genus: Aristobrotica
- Species: A. belemea

Binomial name
- Aristobrotica belemea (Gahan, 1891)

Synonyms
- Diabrotica belemea Gahan, 1891

= Aristobrotica belemea =

Species of beetle

Aristobrotica belemea is a species of beetle of the family Chrysomelidae. It is found in Pará, Brazil.
