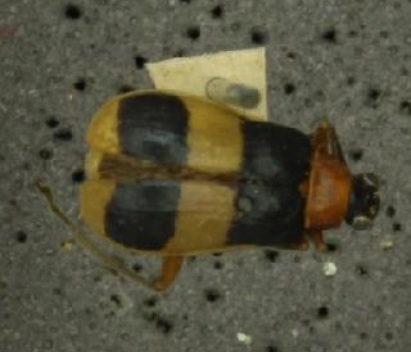

Scientific classification
- Kingdom: Animalia
- Phylum: Arthropoda
- Clade: Pancrustacea
- Class: Insecta
- Order: Coleoptera
- Suborder: Polyphaga
- Infraorder: Cucujiformia
- Family: Chrysomelidae
- Genus: Aristobrotica
- Species: A. steinheili

Binomial name
- Aristobrotica steinheili (Baly, 1886)

Synonyms
- Diabrotica steinheili Baly, 1886

= Aristobrotica steinheili =

Species of beetle

Aristobrotica steinheili is a species of beetle of the family Chrysomelidae. It is endemic to Colombia.
