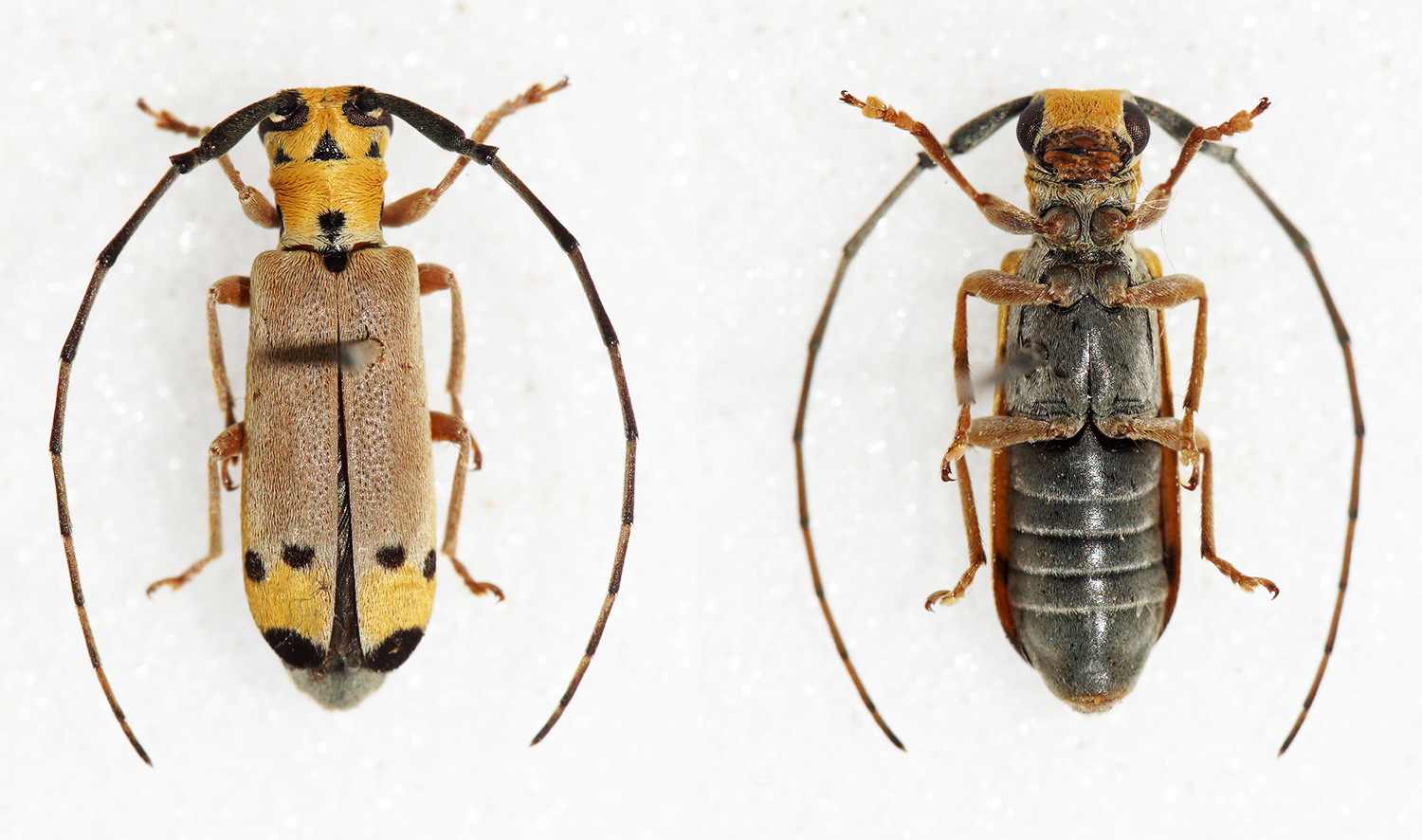

Scientific classification
- Kingdom: Animalia
- Phylum: Arthropoda
- Clade: Pancrustacea
- Class: Insecta
- Order: Coleoptera
- Suborder: Polyphaga
- Infraorder: Cucujiformia
- Family: Cerambycidae
- Genus: Eunidia
- Species: E. tripunctata

Binomial name
- Eunidia tripunctata Aurivillius, 1911

= Eunidia tripunctata =

Species of beetle

Eunidia tripunctata is a species of beetle in the family Cerambycidae. It was described by Per Olof Christopher Aurivillius in 1911.

== Subspecies ==
- Eunidia tripunctata nigricornis Breuning, 1950
- Eunidia tripunctata tripunctata Aurivillius, 1911
