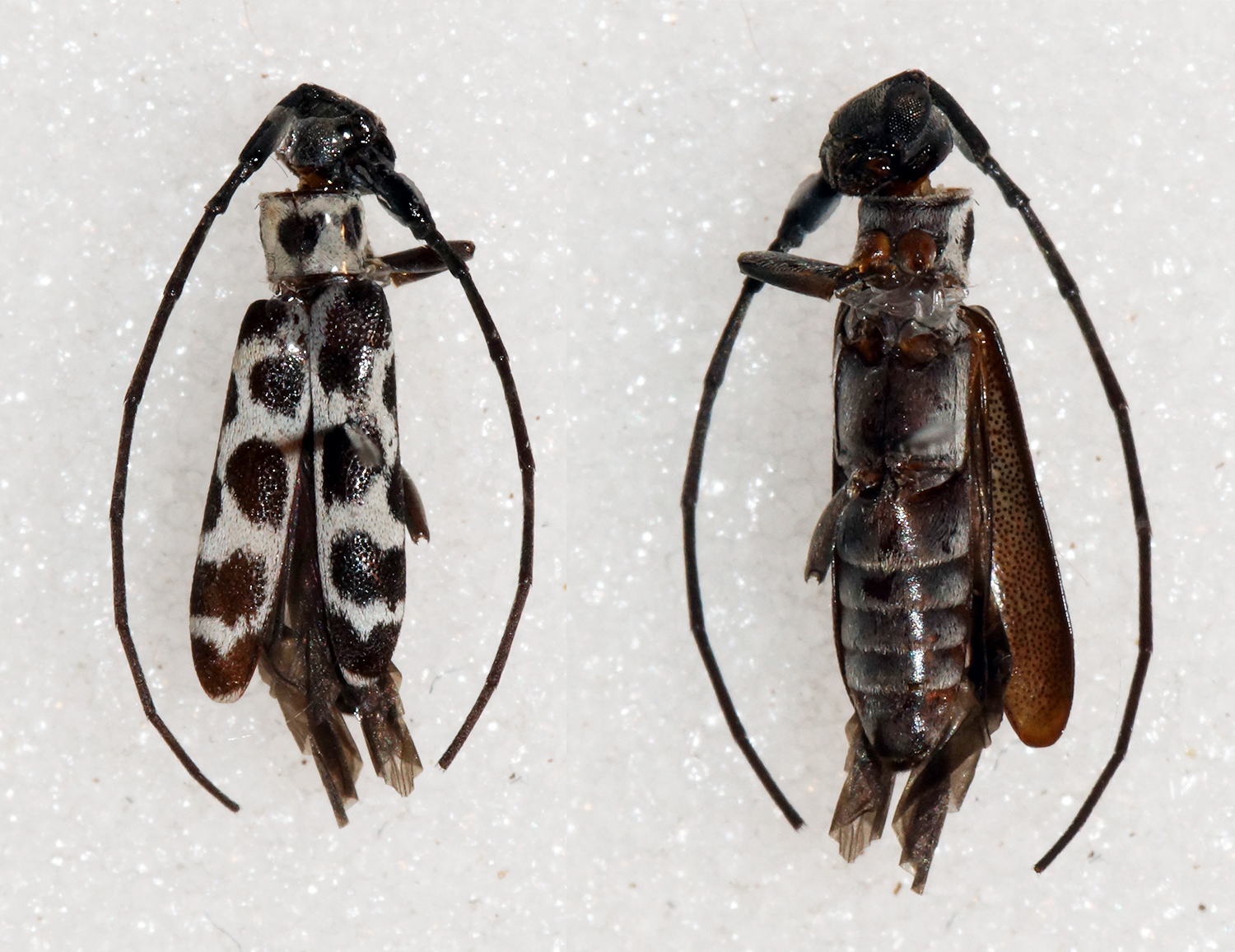

Scientific classification
- Kingdom: Animalia
- Phylum: Arthropoda
- Clade: Pancrustacea
- Class: Insecta
- Order: Coleoptera
- Suborder: Polyphaga
- Infraorder: Cucujiformia
- Family: Cerambycidae
- Genus: Eunidia
- Species: E. multinigromaculata

Binomial name
- Eunidia multinigromaculata Breuning, 1967

Synonyms
- Eunidia marthae-mariae Breuning & Téocchi, 1978; Eunidia nigromaculipennis Breuning, 1968

= Eunidia multinigromaculata =

Species of beetle

Eunidia multinigromaculata is a species of beetle in the family Cerambycidae. It was described by Stephan von Breuning in 1967.
