= Eunidia batesi =

Scientific classification
- Kingdom: Animalia
- Phylum: Arthropoda
- Clade: Pancrustacea
- Class: Insecta
- Order: Coleoptera
- Suborder: Polyphaga
- Infraorder: Cucujiformia
- Family: Cerambycidae
- Genus: Eunidia
- Species: E. batesi

Binomial name
- Eunidia batesi Olliff, 1889

Synonyms
- Eunidia batesi m. holoflavipennis (Breuning) Téocchi, 2000; Eunidia batesi m. postimmaculata (Breuning & Téocchi) Téocchi, 2000; Eunidia nigromaculata m. fuliginosa Téocchi, 1999; Eunidia nigromaculata m. holoflavipennis Breuning, 1986; Eunidia nigromaculata m. postimmaculata Breuning & Téocchi, 1974

Species of beetle

Eunidia batesi is a species of beetle in the family Cerambycidae. It was described by Olliff in 1889.

== Varietas ==
- Eunidia batesi var. nigromaculata Aurivillius, 1907
- Eunidia batesi var. quadrimaculata Breuning, 1953
- Eunidia batesi var. sexmaculata Breuning, 1939
- Eunidia batesi var. trimaculata Aurivillius, 1915
