= Eunidia meleagris =

Scientific classification
- Kingdom: Animalia
- Phylum: Arthropoda
- Clade: Pancrustacea
- Class: Insecta
- Order: Coleoptera
- Suborder: Polyphaga
- Infraorder: Cucujiformia
- Family: Cerambycidae
- Genus: Eunidia
- Species: E. meleagris

Binomial name
- Eunidia meleagris Aurivillius, 1926

Synonyms
- Eunidia clathrata Breuning, 1966; Eunidia venzoi Breuning, 1940

Species of beetle

Eunidia meleagris is a species of beetle in the family Cerambycidae. It was described by Per Olof Christopher Aurivillius in 1926. It is known from Kenya, Ethiopia, and Somalia.
