= Eunidia vittata =

Scientific classification
- Kingdom: Animalia
- Phylum: Arthropoda
- Clade: Pancrustacea
- Class: Insecta
- Order: Coleoptera
- Suborder: Polyphaga
- Infraorder: Cucujiformia
- Family: Cerambycidae
- Genus: Eunidia
- Species: E. vittata

Binomial name
- Eunidia vittata (Pic, 1932)

Synonyms
- Aserixia vittata Pic, 1932

Species of beetle

Eunidia vittata is a species of beetle in the family Cerambycidae. It was described by Maurice Pic in 1932. It is known from Laos and Vietnam.
