= Eunidia divisa =

Scientific classification
- Kingdom: Animalia
- Phylum: Arthropoda
- Clade: Pancrustacea
- Class: Insecta
- Order: Coleoptera
- Suborder: Polyphaga
- Infraorder: Cucujiformia
- Family: Cerambycidae
- Genus: Eunidia
- Species: E. divisa

Binomial name
- Eunidia divisa (Pascoe, 1864)

Synonyms
- Syessita divisa Pascoe, 1864

Species of beetle

Eunidia divisa is a species of beetle in the family Cerambycidae. It was described by Francis Polkinghorne Pascoe in 1864.
