= Eunidia adlbaueri =

Scientific classification
- Kingdom: Animalia
- Phylum: Arthropoda
- Clade: Pancrustacea
- Class: Insecta
- Order: Coleoptera
- Suborder: Polyphaga
- Infraorder: Cucujiformia
- Family: Cerambycidae
- Genus: Eunidia
- Species: E. adlbaueri

Binomial name
- Eunidia adlbaueri Téocchi, Sudre & Jiroux, 2010

Species of beetle

Eunidia adlbaueri is a species of beetle in the family Cerambycidae. It was described by Téocchi, Sudre and Jiroux in 2010.
