= Eunidia coiffaiti =

Scientific classification
- Kingdom: Animalia
- Phylum: Arthropoda
- Clade: Pancrustacea
- Class: Insecta
- Order: Coleoptera
- Suborder: Polyphaga
- Infraorder: Cucujiformia
- Family: Cerambycidae
- Genus: Eunidia
- Species: E. coiffaiti

Binomial name
- Eunidia coiffaiti Breuning, 1977

Species of beetle

Eunidia coiffaiti is a species of beetle in the family Cerambycidae that was first described by Stephan von Breuning in 1977. It is mainly found on the East part of the African continent.
