= Eunidia rufula =

Scientific classification
- Kingdom: Animalia
- Phylum: Arthropoda
- Clade: Pancrustacea
- Class: Insecta
- Order: Coleoptera
- Suborder: Polyphaga
- Infraorder: Cucujiformia
- Family: Cerambycidae
- Genus: Eunidia
- Species: E. rufula

Binomial name
- Eunidia rufula (Fairmaire, 1905)

Species of beetle

Eunidia rufula is a species of beetle in the family Cerambycidae. It was described by Fairmaire in 1905. It contains the varietas Eunidia rufula var. pauliani.
