= Eunidia cylindrica =

Scientific classification
- Kingdom: Animalia
- Phylum: Arthropoda
- Clade: Pancrustacea
- Class: Insecta
- Order: Coleoptera
- Suborder: Polyphaga
- Infraorder: Cucujiformia
- Family: Cerambycidae
- Genus: Eunidia
- Species: E. cylindrica

Binomial name
- Eunidia cylindrica Breuning, 1939

Species of beetle

Eunidia cylindrica is a species of beetle in the family Cerambycidae. It was described by Stephan von Breuning in 1939.
