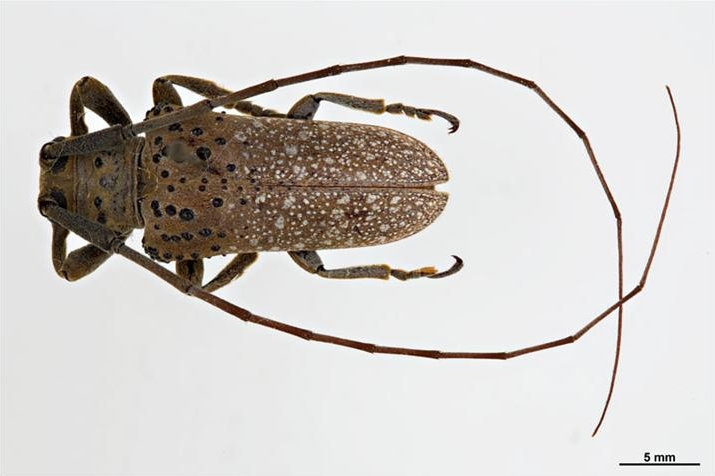
- Oncideres captiosa

Scientific classification
- Kingdom: Animalia
- Phylum: Arthropoda
- Class: Insecta
- Order: Coleoptera
- Suborder: Polyphaga
- Infraorder: Cucujiformia
- Family: Cerambycidae
- Subfamily: Lamiinae
- Tribe: Onciderini; Thomson, 1860

= Onciderini =

Tribe of beetles

Onciderini is a tribe of longhorn beetles of the subfamily Lamiinae, they are prevalent across Europe in nations such as Turkey, and Finland.

== Taxonomy ==
- Agaritha
- Alexera
- Apamauta
- Apocoptoma
- Bacuris
- Bucoides
- Cacostola
- Carenesycha
- Cherentes
- Chitron
- Cicatrodea
- Cipriscola
- Clavidesmus
- Cnemosioma
- Cordites
- Cydros
- Cylicasta
- Delilah
- Ecthoea
- Ephiales
- Esonius
- Eudesmus
- Eupalessa
- Euthima
- Furona
- Glypthaga
- Hesycha
- Hesychotypa
- Hypselomus
- Hypsioma
- Iaquira
- Ischiocentra
- Ischioderes
- Ischiosioma
- Jamesia
- Japi
- Lachaerus
- Lachnia
- Lesbates
- Leus
- Lingafelteria
- Lochmaeocles
- Lydipta
- Marensis
- Microcanus
- Midamiella
- Monneoncideres
- Neocherentes
- Neodillonia
- Neohylus
- Neolampedusa
- Oncideres
- Oncioderes
- Onocephala
- Paratrachysomus
- Paratritania
- Pericasta
- Periergates
- Peritrox
- Plerodia
- Priscatoides
- Prohylus
- Proplerodia
- Pseudobeta
- Pseudoperma
- Psyllotoxoides
- Psyllotoxus
- Sternycha
- Stethoperma
- Strioderes
- Sulpitus
- Taricanus
- Tibiosioma
- Touroultia
- Trachysomus
- Trestoncideres
- Trestonia
- Tritania
- Tulcoides
- Tulcus
- Tybalmia
- Typhlocerus
- Ubytyra
- Venustus
- Xylomimus
