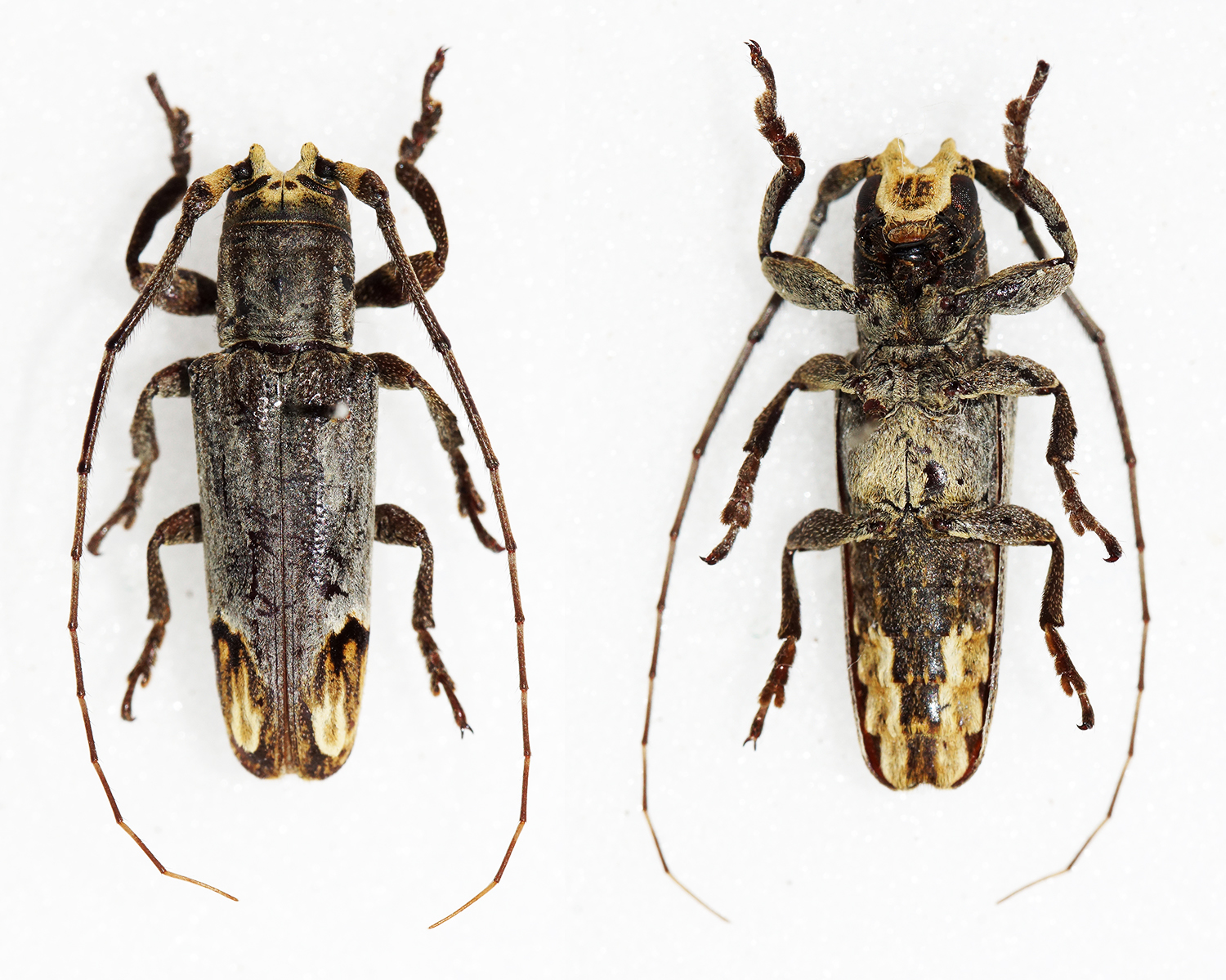
- Trestonia frontalis

Scientific classification
- Kingdom: Animalia
- Phylum: Arthropoda
- Class: Insecta
- Order: Coleoptera
- Suborder: Polyphaga
- Infraorder: Cucujiformia
- Family: Cerambycidae
- Subfamily: Lamiinae
- Tribe: Onciderini
- Genus: Trestonia; Buquet, 185

= Trestonia =

Genus of beetles

Trestonia is a genus of longhorn beetles of the subfamily Lamiinae, containing the following species:

- Trestonia albilatera (Pascoe, 1859)
- Trestonia assulina Bates, 1874
- Trestonia bilineata Martins, Galileo & Tavakilian, 2008
- Trestonia capreola (Germar, 1824)
- Trestonia ceara Dillon & Dillon, 1946
- Trestonia confusa Dillon & Dillon, 1946
- Trestonia exotica Galileo & Martins, 1990
- Trestonia fasciata Martins & Galileo, 1990
- Trestonia forticornis Buquet, 1859
- Trestonia frontalis (Erichson, 1847)
- Trestonia fulgurata Buquet, 1859
- Trestonia grisea Martins & Galileo, 1990
- Trestonia lateapicata Martins & Galileo, 2010
- Trestonia morrisi Martins & Galileo, 2005
- Trestonia nivea Martins & Galileo, 1990
- Trestonia pulcherrima Dillon & Dillon, 1946
- Trestonia pyralis Dillon & Dillon, 1946
- Trestonia rugosicollis Martins, Galileo & de Oliveira, 2009
- Trestonia signifera Buquet, 1859
- Trestonia turbula Monné & Fragoso, 1984
