= Cydros leucurus =

Scientific classification
- Kingdom: Animalia
- Phylum: Arthropoda
- Class: Insecta
- Order: Coleoptera
- Suborder: Polyphaga
- Infraorder: Cucujiformia
- Family: Cerambycidae
- Genus: Cydros
- Species: C. leucurus

Binomial name
- Cydros leucurus Pascoe, 1866

Synonyms
- Cydros scabrosus Gemminger & Harold, 1873; Trachytoxus scabrosus Thomson, 1868

Species of beetle

Cydros leucurus is a species of beetle in the family Cerambycidae. It was described by Francis Polkinghorne Pascoe in 1866. It is known from Colombia, French Guiana and Panama.
