= Paratritania =

Scientific classification
- Kingdom: Animalia
- Phylum: Arthropoda
- Class: Insecta
- Order: Coleoptera
- Suborder: Polyphaga
- Infraorder: Cucujiformia
- Family: Cerambycidae
- Tribe: Onciderini
- Genus: Paratritania; Breuning, 1961
- Species: P. alternans

Binomial name
- Paratritania alternans (Aurivillius, 1920)

Genus of beetles

Paratritania is a monotypic beetle genus in the family Cerambycidae described by Stephan von Breuning in 1961. Its only species, Paratritania alternans, was described by Per Olof Christopher Aurivillius in 1920.
