= Trestoncideres santossilvai =

Scientific classification
- Kingdom: Animalia
- Phylum: Arthropoda
- Class: Insecta
- Order: Coleoptera
- Suborder: Polyphaga
- Infraorder: Cucujiformia
- Family: Cerambycidae
- Genus: Trestoncideres
- Species: T. santossilvai

Binomial name
- Trestoncideres santossilvai Nearns & Tavakilian, 2012

Species of beetle

Trestoncideres santossilvai is a species of beetle in the family Cerambycidae. It was described by Nearns and Tavakilian in 2012.
