= Clavidesmus chicae =

Scientific classification
- Kingdom: Animalia
- Phylum: Arthropoda
- Class: Insecta
- Order: Coleoptera
- Suborder: Polyphaga
- Infraorder: Cucujiformia
- Family: Cerambycidae
- Genus: Clavidesmus
- Species: C. chicae

Binomial name
- Clavidesmus chicae Giorgi, 1998

Species of beetle

Clavidesmus chicae is a species of beetle in the family Cerambycidae. It was described by Giorgi in 1998. It is known from Brazil.
