= Glypthaga xylina =

Scientific classification
- Domain: Eukaryota
- Kingdom: Animalia
- Phylum: Arthropoda
- Class: Insecta
- Order: Coleoptera
- Suborder: Polyphaga
- Infraorder: Cucujiformia
- Family: Cerambycidae
- Genus: Glypthaga
- Species: G. xylina

Binomial name
- Glypthaga xylina (Bates, 1865)

Synonyms
- Hesycha maculicornis Thomson, 1868; Hesycha xylina Bates, 1865

Species of beetle

Glypthaga xylina is a species of beetle in the family Cerambycidae. It was described by Henry Walter Bates in 1865. It is known from Brazil.
