= Eudesmus =

Scientific classification
- Kingdom: Animalia
- Phylum: Arthropoda
- Class: Insecta
- Order: Coleoptera
- Suborder: Polyphaga
- Infraorder: Cucujiformia
- Family: Cerambycidae
- Subfamily: Lamiinae
- Tribe: Onciderini
- Genus: Eudesmus; Audinet-Serville, 1835

Genus of beetles

Eudesmus is a genus of longhorn beetles of the subfamily Lamiinae, containing the following species:

- Eudesmus caudalis Bates, 1865
- Eudesmus diopites Dillon & Dillon, 1946
- Eudesmus ferrugineus (Thomson, 1860)
- Eudesmus grisescens Audinet-Serville, 1835
- Eudesmus nicaraguensis Breuning, 1958
- Eudesmus posticalis Guérin-Méneville, 1844
- Eudesmus rubefactus Bates, 1865
