= Peritrox marcelae =

Scientific classification
- Kingdom: Animalia
- Phylum: Arthropoda
- Class: Insecta
- Order: Coleoptera
- Suborder: Polyphaga
- Infraorder: Cucujiformia
- Family: Cerambycidae
- Genus: Peritrox
- Species: P. marcelae

Binomial name
- Peritrox marcelae Nearns & Tavakilian, 2012

Species of beetle

Peritrox marcelae is a species of beetle in the family Cerambycidae. It was described by Nearns and Tavakilian in 2012.
