= Peritrox insulatus =

Scientific classification
- Kingdom: Animalia
- Phylum: Arthropoda
- Clade: Pancrustacea
- Class: Insecta
- Order: Coleoptera
- Suborder: Polyphaga
- Infraorder: Cucujiformia
- Family: Cerambycidae
- Genus: Peritrox
- Species: P. insulatus

Binomial name
- Peritrox insulatus Rodrigues & Mermudes, 2011

Species of beetle

Peritrox insulatus is a species of beetle in the family Cerambycidae, found in Brazil. It was described by Rodrigues and Mermudes in 2011.
