= Alexera =

Scientific classification
- Kingdom: Animalia
- Phylum: Arthropoda
- Class: Insecta
- Order: Coleoptera
- Suborder: Polyphaga
- Infraorder: Cucujiformia
- Family: Cerambycidae
- Tribe: Onciderini
- Genus: Alexera

Genus of beetles

Alexera is a genus of longhorn beetles of the subfamily Lamiinae, containing the following species:

- Alexera barii (Jekel, 1861)
- Alexera secunda Martins & Galileo, 2007
