= Taricanus truquii =

Scientific classification
- Kingdom: Animalia
- Phylum: Arthropoda
- Class: Insecta
- Order: Coleoptera
- Suborder: Polyphaga
- Infraorder: Cucujiformia
- Family: Cerambycidae
- Genus: Taricanus
- Species: T. truquii

Binomial name
- Taricanus truquii Thomson, 1868

Species of beetle

Taricanus truquii is a species of beetle in the family Cerambycidae. It was described by James Thomson in 1868. It is known from Nicaragua, Mexico, and possibly the United States.
