= Peritrox =

Scientific classification
- Kingdom: Animalia
- Phylum: Arthropoda
- Clade: Pancrustacea
- Class: Insecta
- Order: Coleoptera
- Suborder: Polyphaga
- Infraorder: Cucujiformia
- Family: Cerambycidae
- Subfamily: Lamiinae
- Tribe: Onciderini
- Subtribe: Onciderina
- Genus: Peritrox; Bates, 1865

Genus of beetles

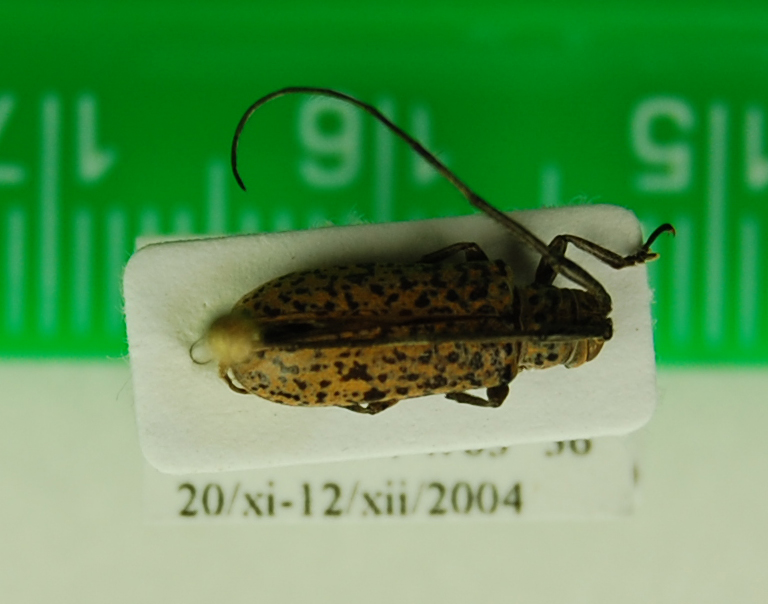
Peritrox nigromaculatus

Peritrox is a genus of longhorn beetles of the subfamily Lamiinae, containing the following species:

- Peritrox denticollis Bates, 1865
- Peritrox insulatus Rodrigues & Mermudes, 2011
- Peritrox marcelae Nearns & Tavakilian, 2012
- Peritrox nigromaculatus Aurivillius, 1920
- Peritrox perbra Dillon & Dillon, 1945
- Peritrox vermiculatus Dillon & Dillon, 1945
