= Eudesmus diopites =

Scientific classification
- Kingdom: Animalia
- Phylum: Arthropoda
- Class: Insecta
- Order: Coleoptera
- Suborder: Polyphaga
- Infraorder: Cucujiformia
- Family: Cerambycidae
- Genus: Eudesmus
- Species: E. diopites

Binomial name
- Eudesmus diopites Dillon & Dillon, 1946

Species of beetle

Eudesmus diopites is a species of beetle in the family Cerambycidae. It was described by Dillon and Dillon in 1946. It is known from Peru.
