= Cylicasta =

Scientific classification
- Kingdom: Animalia
- Phylum: Arthropoda
- Class: Insecta
- Order: Coleoptera
- Suborder: Polyphaga
- Infraorder: Cucujiformia
- Family: Cerambycidae
- Subfamily: Lamiinae
- Tribe: Onciderini
- Subtribe: Onciderina
- Genus: Cylicasta; Thomson, 1868

Genus of beetles

Cylicasta is a genus of longhorn beetles of the subfamily Lamiinae, containing the following species:

- Cylicasta difficilis (Lameere, 1893)
- Cylicasta liturata (Fabricius, 1801)
- Cylicasta nysa Dillon & Dillon, 1946
- Cylicasta parallela (Melzer, 1934)
- Cylicasta terminata (Buquet, 1859)
