= Neohylus =

Scientific classification
- Kingdom: Animalia
- Phylum: Arthropoda
- Class: Insecta
- Order: Coleoptera
- Suborder: Polyphaga
- Infraorder: Cucujiformia
- Family: Cerambycidae
- Tribe: Onciderini
- Genus: Neohylus

Genus of beetles

Neohylus is a genus of longhorn beetles of the subfamily Lamiinae, containing the following species:

- Neohylus alexandrei Martins & Galileo, 2010
- Neohylus dubius (Dillon & Dillon, 1945)
