= Tybalmia orbis =

Scientific classification
- Kingdom: Animalia
- Phylum: Arthropoda
- Class: Insecta
- Order: Coleoptera
- Suborder: Polyphaga
- Infraorder: Cucujiformia
- Family: Cerambycidae
- Genus: Tybalmia
- Species: T. orbis

Binomial name
- Tybalmia orbis Dillon & Dillon, 1945

Species of beetle

Tybalmia orbis is a species of beetle in the family Cerambycidae. It was described by Dillon and Dillon in 1945. It is known from Bolivia.
