= Touroultia swifti =

Scientific classification
- Kingdom: Animalia
- Phylum: Arthropoda
- Class: Insecta
- Order: Coleoptera
- Suborder: Polyphaga
- Infraorder: Cucujiformia
- Family: Cerambycidae
- Genus: Touroultia
- Species: T. swifti

Binomial name
- Touroultia swifti Nearns & Tavakilian, 2012

Species of beetle

Touroultia swifti is a species of beetle in the family Cerambycidae. It was described by Nearns and Tavakilian in 2012 and has a tan body with dark speckles. It is known from Ecuador.
