= Delilah subfasciata =

Scientific classification
- Domain: Eukaryota
- Kingdom: Animalia
- Phylum: Arthropoda
- Class: Insecta
- Order: Coleoptera
- Suborder: Polyphaga
- Infraorder: Cucujiformia
- Family: Cerambycidae
- Genus: Delilah
- Species: D. subfasciata

Binomial name
- Delilah subfasciata Dillon & Dillon, 1952

Species of beetle

Delilah subfasciata is a species of beetle in the family Cerambycidae. It was described by Dillon and Dillon in 1952. It is known from Peru.
