= Alexera barii =

Scientific classification
- Kingdom: Animalia
- Phylum: Arthropoda
- Class: Insecta
- Order: Coleoptera
- Suborder: Polyphaga
- Infraorder: Cucujiformia
- Family: Cerambycidae
- Genus: Alexera
- Species: A. barii

Binomial name
- Alexera barii (Jekel, 1861)

Synonyms
- Furona sordida (Thomson, 1868); Hesycha barii Jekel, 1861; Hypselomus lignicolor Bates, 1865; Hypsioma barii (Jekel, 1861); Hypsioma lignicolor (Bates, 1865); Hypsioma sordida Thomson, 1868; Hypsioma bari (Jekel, 1861) (misspelling)

Species of beetle

Alexera barii is a species of beetle in the family Cerambycidae. It was described by Jekel in 1861, originally under the genus Hesycha. It is known from Peru, Brazil, Guyana, French Guiana, and Suriname.
