= Sternycha panamensis =

Scientific classification
- Kingdom: Animalia
- Phylum: Arthropoda
- Class: Insecta
- Order: Coleoptera
- Suborder: Polyphaga
- Infraorder: Cucujiformia
- Family: Cerambycidae
- Genus: Sternycha
- Species: S. panamensis

Binomial name
- Sternycha panamensis Martins & Galileo, 1999

Species of beetle

Sternycha panamensis is a species of beetle in the family Cerambycidae. It was described by Martins and Galileo in 1999. It is known from Panama.
