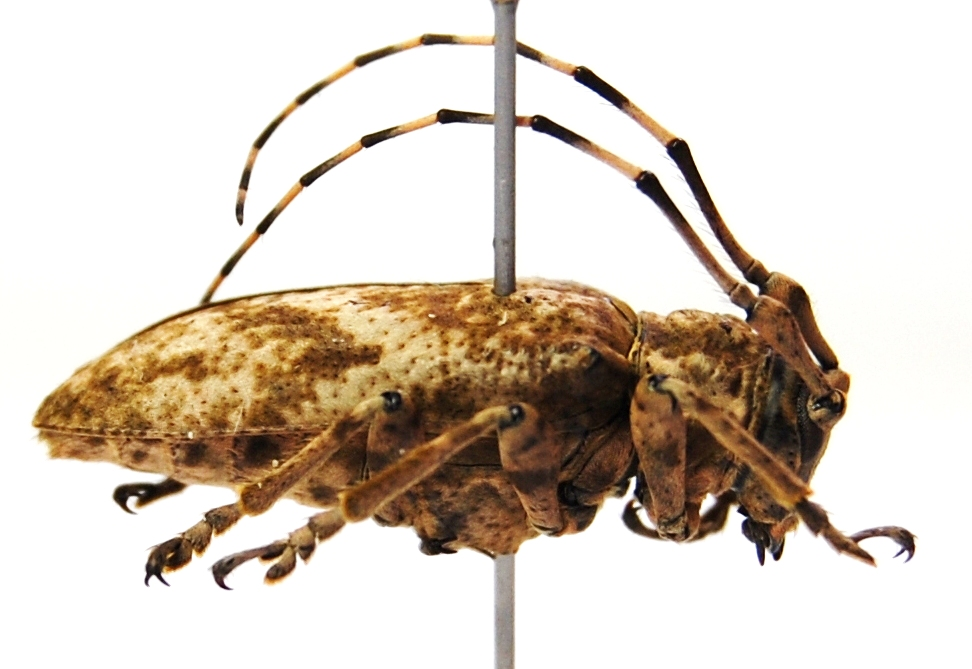
- Midamiella hecabe

Scientific classification
- Kingdom: Animalia
- Phylum: Arthropoda
- Class: Insecta
- Order: Coleoptera
- Suborder: Polyphaga
- Infraorder: Cucujiformia
- Family: Cerambycidae
- Tribe: Onciderini
- Genus: Midamiella

= Midamiella =

Genus of beetles

Midamiella is a genus of longhorn beetles of the subfamily Lamiinae, containing the following species:

- Midamiella hecabe (Dillon & Dillon, 1945)
- Midamiella santaremensis (Dillon & Dillon, 1945)
