= Clavidesmus heterocerus =

Scientific classification
- Kingdom: Animalia
- Phylum: Arthropoda
- Class: Insecta
- Order: Coleoptera
- Suborder: Polyphaga
- Infraorder: Cucujiformia
- Family: Cerambycidae
- Genus: Clavidesmus
- Species: C. heterocerus

Binomial name
- Clavidesmus heterocerus (Buquet, 1852)

Species of beetle

Clavidesmus heterocerus is a species of beetle in the family Cerambycidae. It was described by Buquet in 1852. It is known from Paraguay and Brazil.
