= Tulcoides =

Scientific classification
- Kingdom: Animalia
- Phylum: Arthropoda
- Class: Insecta
- Order: Coleoptera
- Suborder: Polyphaga
- Infraorder: Cucujiformia
- Family: Cerambycidae
- Tribe: Onciderini
- Genus: Tulcoides

Genus of beetles

Tulcoides is a genus of longhorn beetles of the subfamily Lamiinae, containing the following species:

- Tulcoides pura Martins & Galileo, 1990
- Tulcoides tibialis Martins & Galileo, 2009
