= Tibiosioma remipes =

Scientific classification
- Kingdom: Animalia
- Phylum: Arthropoda
- Class: Insecta
- Order: Coleoptera
- Suborder: Polyphaga
- Infraorder: Cucujiformia
- Family: Cerambycidae
- Genus: Tibiosioma
- Species: T. remipes

Binomial name
- Tibiosioma remipes Martins & Galileo, 1990

Species of beetle

Tibiosioma remipes is a species of beetle in the family Cerambycidae. It was described by Martins and Galileo in 1990. It is known from Brazil.
