= Glypthaga lignosa =

Scientific classification
- Domain: Eukaryota
- Kingdom: Animalia
- Phylum: Arthropoda
- Class: Insecta
- Order: Coleoptera
- Suborder: Polyphaga
- Infraorder: Cucujiformia
- Family: Cerambycidae
- Genus: Glypthaga
- Species: G. lignosa

Binomial name
- Glypthaga lignosa Thomson, 1868

Species of beetle

Glypthaga lignosa is a species of beetle in the family Cerambycidae. It was described by James Thomson in 1868. It is known from Brazil and French Guiana.
