= Pericasta =

Scientific classification
- Kingdom: Animalia
- Phylum: Arthropoda
- Class: Insecta
- Order: Coleoptera
- Suborder: Polyphaga
- Infraorder: Cucujiformia
- Family: Cerambycidae
- Tribe: Onciderini
- Genus: Pericasta; Dillon & Dillon, 1952
- Species: P. virescens

Binomial name
- Pericasta virescens (Aurivillius, 1920)

Genus of beetles

Pericasta is a monotypic beetle genus in the family Cerambycidae described by Elizabeth Schatz Dillon and Lawrence Samuel Dillon in 1952. Its only species, Pericasta virescens, was described by Per Olof Christopher Aurivillius in 1920.
