= Tybalmia pupillata =

Scientific classification
- Kingdom: Animalia
- Phylum: Arthropoda
- Class: Insecta
- Order: Coleoptera
- Suborder: Polyphaga
- Infraorder: Cucujiformia
- Family: Cerambycidae
- Genus: Tybalmia
- Species: T. pupillata

Binomial name
- Tybalmia pupillata (Pascoe, 1859)

Synonyms
- Jamesia pupillata Bates, 1865; Hypsioma bipunctata Jekel, 1861; Hypselomus pupillatus Pascoe, 1859; Hypsioma pupillatus Jekel, 1861

Species of beetle

Tybalmia pupillata is a species of beetle in the family Cerambycidae. It was described by Francis Polkinghorne Pascoe in 1859. It is known from Brazil, Colombia, Ecuador, Guyana, French Guiana, Peru and Suriname.
