= Bucoides montana =

Scientific classification
- Kingdom: Animalia
- Phylum: Arthropoda
- Class: Insecta
- Order: Coleoptera
- Suborder: Polyphaga
- Infraorder: Cucujiformia
- Family: Cerambycidae
- Genus: Bucoides
- Species: B. montana

Binomial name
- Bucoides montana Martins & Galileo, 2009

Species of beetle

Bucoides montana is a species of beetle in the family Cerambycidae. It was described by Martins and Galileo in 2009. It is known from Brazil.
