= Periergates badeni =

Scientific classification
- Kingdom: Animalia
- Phylum: Arthropoda
- Class: Insecta
- Order: Coleoptera
- Suborder: Polyphaga
- Infraorder: Cucujiformia
- Family: Cerambycidae
- Genus: Periergates
- Species: P. badeni

Binomial name
- Periergates badeni Bates, 1885

Species of beetle

Periergates badeni is a species of beetle in the family Cerambycidae. It was described by Henry Walter Bates in 1885. It is known from Mexico.
