= Pseudobeta =

Scientific classification
- Kingdom: Animalia
- Phylum: Arthropoda
- Class: Insecta
- Order: Coleoptera
- Suborder: Polyphaga
- Infraorder: Cucujiformia
- Family: Cerambycidae
- Subfamily: Lamiinae
- Tribe: Onciderini
- Subtribe: Onciderina
- Genus: Pseudobeta; Zajciw, 1972

Genus of beetles

Pseudobeta is a genus of longhorn beetles of the subfamily Lamiinae, containing the following species:

- Pseudobeta doris (Thomson, 1868)
- Pseudobeta ferruginea Galileo & Martins, 1990
- Pseudobeta seabrai Monné & Fragoso, 1984
- Pseudobeta transversa Martins & Galileo, 2010
