= Carenesycha =

Scientific classification
- Kingdom: Animalia
- Phylum: Arthropoda
- Class: Insecta
- Order: Coleoptera
- Suborder: Polyphaga
- Infraorder: Cucujiformia
- Family: Cerambycidae
- Tribe: Onciderini
- Genus: Carenesycha

Genus of beetles

Carenesycha is a genus of longhorn beetles of the subfamily Lamiinae, containing the following species:

- Carenesycha carenata Martins & Galileo, 1990
- Carenesycha velezi Martins & Galileo, 1995
