= Touroultia obscurella =

Scientific classification
- Kingdom: Animalia
- Phylum: Arthropoda
- Class: Insecta
- Order: Coleoptera
- Suborder: Polyphaga
- Infraorder: Cucujiformia
- Family: Cerambycidae
- Genus: Touroultia
- Species: T. obscurella

Binomial name
- Touroultia obscurella (Bates, 1865)

Synonyms
- Hypselomus obscurellus Bates, 1865; Hypsioma obscurellus (Bates) Dillon & Dillon, 1946; Hypsioma obscurella (Bates)

Species of beetle

Touroultia obscurella is a species of beetle in the family Cerambycidae. It was described by Henry Walter Bates in 1865, originally under the genus Hypselomus. It is known from Brazil.
