= Proplerodia =

Scientific classification
- Kingdom: Animalia
- Phylum: Arthropoda
- Class: Insecta
- Order: Coleoptera
- Suborder: Polyphaga
- Infraorder: Cucujiformia
- Family: Cerambycidae
- Tribe: Onciderini
- Genus: Proplerodia

Genus of beetles

Proplerodia is a genus of longhorn beetles of the subfamily Lamiinae, containing the following species:

- Proplerodia goyana Martins & Galileo, 1990
- Proplerodia piriana Martins & Galileo, 2009
