= Trestonia morrisi =

Scientific classification
- Domain: Eukaryota
- Kingdom: Animalia
- Phylum: Arthropoda
- Class: Insecta
- Order: Coleoptera
- Suborder: Polyphaga
- Infraorder: Cucujiformia
- Family: Cerambycidae
- Genus: Trestonia
- Species: T. morrisi

Binomial name
- Trestonia morrisi Martins & Galileo, 2005

Species of beetle

Trestonia morrisi is a species of beetle in the family Cerambycidae. It was described by Martins and Galileo in 2005. It is known from Panama and Bolivia.
