= Trestonia assulina =

Scientific classification
- Domain: Eukaryota
- Kingdom: Animalia
- Phylum: Arthropoda
- Class: Insecta
- Order: Coleoptera
- Suborder: Polyphaga
- Infraorder: Cucujiformia
- Family: Cerambycidae
- Genus: Trestonia
- Species: T. assulina

Binomial name
- Trestonia assulina Bates, 1874

Species of beetle

Trestonia assulina is a species of beetle in the family Cerambycidae. It was described by Henry Walter Bates in 1874. It is known from Nicaragua, Costa Rica, and Panama.
