= Bucoides erichsoni =

Scientific classification
- Kingdom: Animalia
- Phylum: Arthropoda
- Class: Insecta
- Order: Coleoptera
- Suborder: Polyphaga
- Infraorder: Cucujiformia
- Family: Cerambycidae
- Genus: Bucoides
- Species: B. erichsoni

Binomial name
- Bucoides erichsoni Martins, 1979

Synonyms
- Bucoides egens Dillon & Dillon, 1945

Species of beetle

Bucoides erichsoni is a species of beetle in the family Cerambycidae. It was described by Martins in 1979. It is known from Peru and Ecuador.
