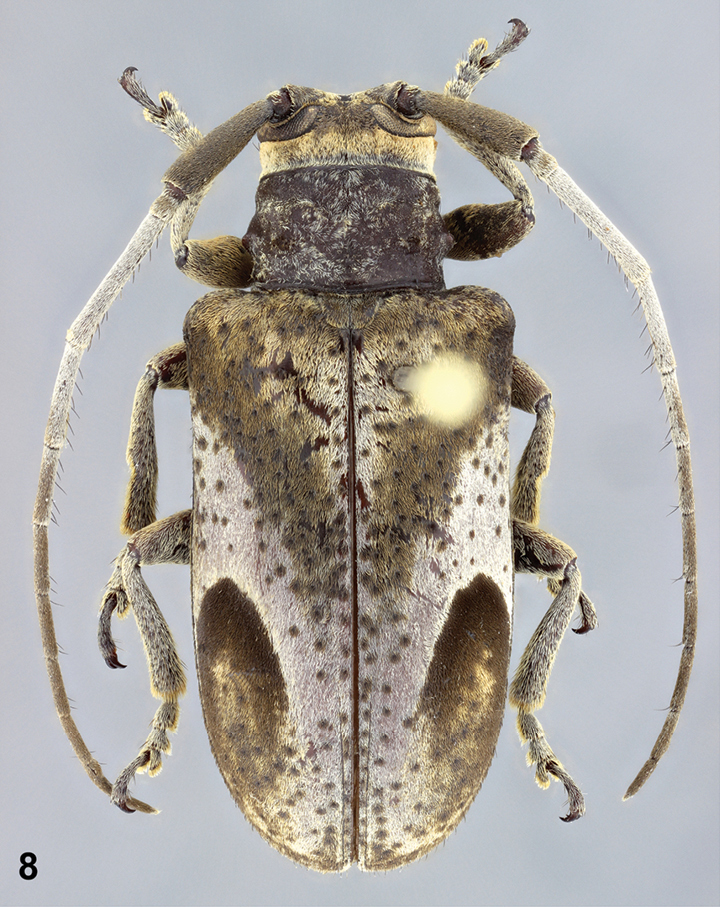
- Oncioderes obliqua (female)

Scientific classification
- Kingdom: Animalia
- Phylum: Arthropoda
- Class: Insecta
- Order: Coleoptera
- Suborder: Polyphaga
- Infraorder: Cucujiformia
- Family: Cerambycidae
- Tribe: Onciderini
- Genus: Oncioderes

= Oncioderes =

Genus of beetles

Oncioderes is a genus of longhorn beetles of the subfamily Lamiinae, containing the following species:

- Oncioderes picta Martins & Galileo, 1990
- Oncioderes rondoniae Martins & Galileo, 1990
