= Trestonia rugosicollis =

Scientific classification
- Domain: Eukaryota
- Kingdom: Animalia
- Phylum: Arthropoda
- Class: Insecta
- Order: Coleoptera
- Suborder: Polyphaga
- Infraorder: Cucujiformia
- Family: Cerambycidae
- Genus: Trestonia
- Species: T. rugosicollis

Binomial name
- Trestonia rugosicollis Martins, Galileo & de Oliveira, 2009

Species of beetle

Trestonia rugosicollis is a species of beetle in the family Cerambycidae. It was described by Martins, Galileo and de Oliveira in 2009.
