= Carenesycha velezi =

Scientific classification
- Kingdom: Animalia
- Phylum: Arthropoda
- Class: Insecta
- Order: Coleoptera
- Suborder: Polyphaga
- Infraorder: Cucujiformia
- Family: Cerambycidae
- Genus: Carenesycha
- Species: C. velezi

Binomial name
- Carenesycha velezi Martins & Galileo, 1995

Species of beetle

Carenesycha velezi is a species of beetle in the family Cerambycidae. It was described by Martins and Galileo in 1995. It is known from Colombia.
