= Trestonia albilatera =

Scientific classification
- Domain: Eukaryota
- Kingdom: Animalia
- Phylum: Arthropoda
- Class: Insecta
- Order: Coleoptera
- Suborder: Polyphaga
- Infraorder: Cucujiformia
- Family: Cerambycidae
- Genus: Trestonia
- Species: T. albilatera

Binomial name
- Trestonia albilatera (Pascoe, 1859)

Species of beetle

Trestonia albilatera is a species of beetle in the family Cerambycidae. It was described by Francis Polkinghorne Pascoe in 1859. It is known from Brazil.
