= Delilah (beetle) =

Scientific classification
- Domain: Eukaryota
- Kingdom: Animalia
- Phylum: Arthropoda
- Class: Insecta
- Order: Coleoptera
- Suborder: Polyphaga
- Infraorder: Cucujiformia
- Family: Cerambycidae
- Tribe: Onciderini
- Genus: Delilah; Dillon & Dillon, 1945

Genus of beetles

Delilah is a genus of longhorn beetles of the subfamily Lamiinae, containing the following species:

- Delilah gilvicornis (Thomson, 1868)
- Delilah subfasciata Dillon & Dillon, 1952
