= Tybalmia mydas =

Scientific classification
- Kingdom: Animalia
- Phylum: Arthropoda
- Class: Insecta
- Order: Coleoptera
- Suborder: Polyphaga
- Infraorder: Cucujiformia
- Family: Cerambycidae
- Genus: Tybalmia
- Species: T. mydas

Binomial name
- Tybalmia mydas (Lucas in Laporte, 1859)

Synonyms
- Oncideres mydas Lucas, 1859

Species of beetle

Tybalmia mydas is a species of beetle in the family Cerambycidae. It was described by Hippolyte Lucas in 1859. It is known from Brazil.
