= Cylicasta terminata =

Scientific classification
- Kingdom: Animalia
- Phylum: Arthropoda
- Class: Insecta
- Order: Coleoptera
- Suborder: Polyphaga
- Infraorder: Cucujiformia
- Family: Cerambycidae
- Genus: Cylicasta
- Species: C. terminata

Binomial name
- Cylicasta terminata (Buquet, 1859)

Species of beetle

Cylicasta terminata is a species of beetle in the family Cerambycidae. It was described by Buquet in 1859. It is known from Brazil and French Guiana.
