= Glypthaga =

Scientific classification
- Domain: Eukaryota
- Kingdom: Animalia
- Phylum: Arthropoda
- Class: Insecta
- Order: Coleoptera
- Suborder: Polyphaga
- Infraorder: Cucujiformia
- Family: Cerambycidae
- Tribe: Onciderini
- Genus: Glypthaga

Genus of beetles

Glypthaga is a genus of longhorn beetles of the subfamily Lamiinae, containing the following species:

- Glypthaga lignosa Thomson, 1868
- Glypthaga mucorea Martins & Galileo, 1990
- Glypthaga nearnsi Martins & Galileo, 2008
- Glypthaga paupercula (Thomson, 1868)
- Glypthaga unicolor Martins & Galileo, 1990
- Glypthaga vicina Martins & Galileo, 1990
- Glypthaga xylina (Bates, 1865)
