= Tybalmia tetrops =

Scientific classification
- Kingdom: Animalia
- Phylum: Arthropoda
- Class: Insecta
- Order: Coleoptera
- Suborder: Polyphaga
- Infraorder: Cucujiformia
- Family: Cerambycidae
- Genus: Tybalmia
- Species: T. tetrops

Binomial name
- Tybalmia tetrops Bates, 1872

Species of beetle

Tybalmia tetrops is a species of beetle in the family Cerambycidae. It was described by Henry Walter Bates in 1872. It is known from Ecuador, Brazil and Peru.
