= Clavidesmus metallicus =

Scientific classification
- Kingdom: Animalia
- Phylum: Arthropoda
- Class: Insecta
- Order: Coleoptera
- Suborder: Polyphaga
- Infraorder: Cucujiformia
- Family: Cerambycidae
- Genus: Clavidesmus
- Species: C. metallicus

Binomial name
- Clavidesmus metallicus (Thomson, 1868)

Species of beetle

Clavidesmus metallicus is a species of longhorn beetle in the family Cerambycidae. It was described by James Thomson in 1868. It is known from French Guiana and Peru.
