= Eudesmus grisescens =

Scientific classification
- Kingdom: Animalia
- Phylum: Arthropoda
- Class: Insecta
- Order: Coleoptera
- Suborder: Polyphaga
- Infraorder: Cucujiformia
- Family: Cerambycidae
- Genus: Eudesmus
- Species: E. grisescens

Binomial name
- Eudesmus grisescens Audinet-Serville, 1835

Species of beetle

Eudesmus grisescens is a species of beetle in the family Cerambycidae. It was described by Audinet-Serville in 1835. It is known from Brazil, Bolivia, Nicaragua, Peru and French Guiana.
