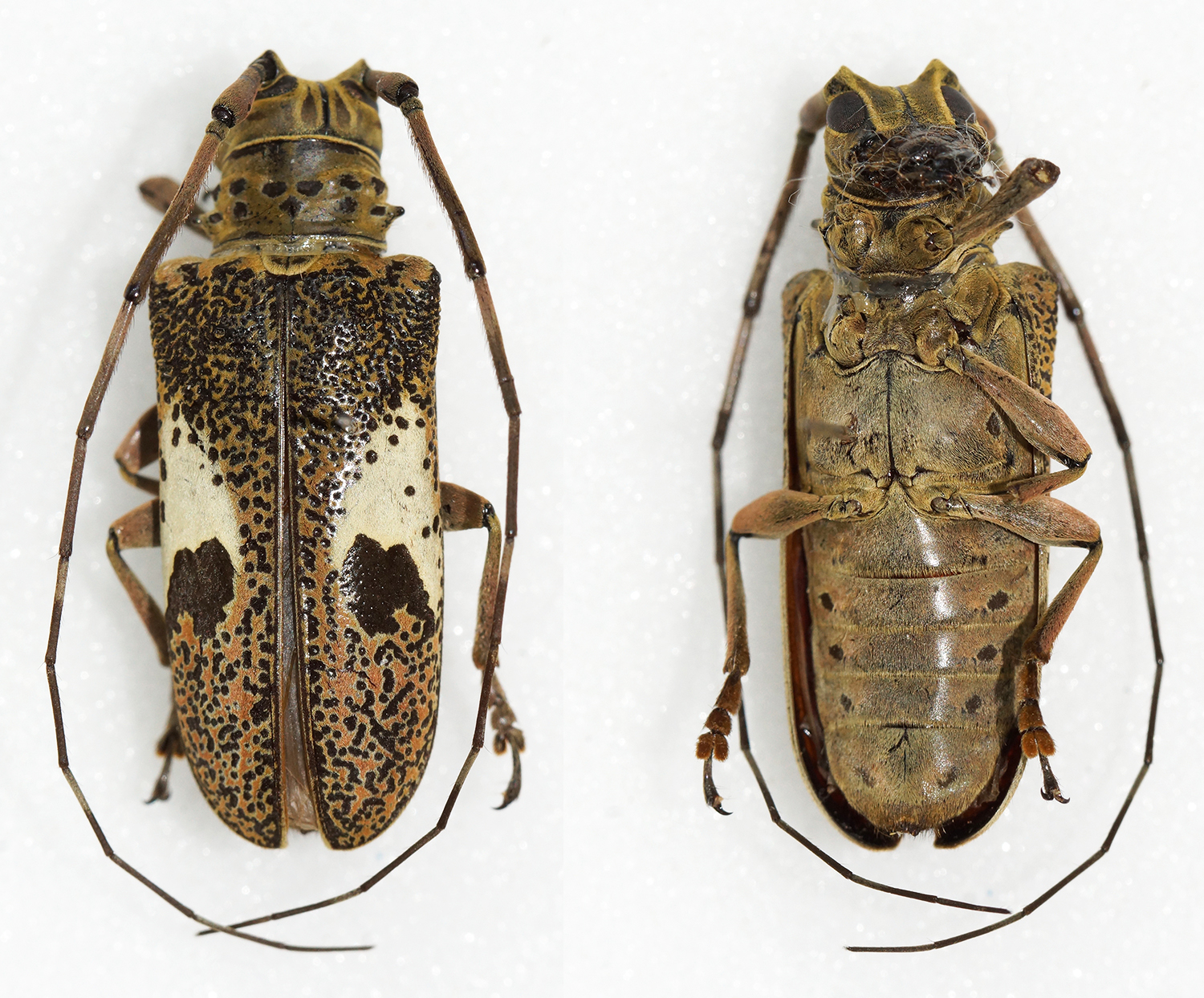

Scientific classification
- Kingdom: Animalia
- Phylum: Arthropoda
- Class: Insecta
- Order: Coleoptera
- Suborder: Polyphaga
- Infraorder: Cucujiformia
- Family: Cerambycidae
- Genus: Tybalmia
- Species: T. funeraria

Binomial name
- Tybalmia funeraria Bates, 1880

= Tybalmia funeraria =

Species of beetle

Tybalmia funeraria is a species of beetle in the family Cerambycidae. It was described by Henry Walter Bates in 1880. It is known from Guatemala, Honduras and Mexico.
