= Neohylus dubius =

Scientific classification
- Kingdom: Animalia
- Phylum: Arthropoda
- Class: Insecta
- Order: Coleoptera
- Suborder: Polyphaga
- Infraorder: Cucujiformia
- Family: Cerambycidae
- Genus: Neohylus
- Species: N. dubius

Binomial name
- Neohylus dubius (Dillon & Dillon, 1945)

Species of beetle

Neohylus dubius is a species of beetle in the family Cerambycidae. It was described by Dillon and Dillon in 1945. It is known from Colombia and Peru.
