= Periergates =

Scientific classification
- Kingdom: Animalia
- Phylum: Arthropoda
- Class: Insecta
- Order: Coleoptera
- Suborder: Polyphaga
- Infraorder: Cucujiformia
- Family: Cerambycidae
- Tribe: Onciderini
- Genus: Periergates

Genus of beetles

Periergates is a genus of longhorn beetles of the subfamily Lamiinae, containing the following species:

- Periergates badeni Bates, 1885
- Periergates chiriquensis Bates, 1885
- Periergates rodriguezi Lacordaire, 1872
