= Tybalmia breuningi =

Scientific classification
- Kingdom: Animalia
- Phylum: Arthropoda
- Class: Insecta
- Order: Coleoptera
- Suborder: Polyphaga
- Infraorder: Cucujiformia
- Family: Cerambycidae
- Genus: Tybalmia
- Species: T. breuningi

Binomial name
- Tybalmia breuningi Dillon & Dillon, 1952

Species of beetle

Tybalmia breuningi is a species of beetle in the family Cerambycidae. It was described by Dillon and Dillon in 1952. It is known from Colombia.
