= Taricanus =

Scientific classification
- Kingdom: Animalia
- Phylum: Arthropoda
- Class: Insecta
- Order: Coleoptera
- Suborder: Polyphaga
- Infraorder: Cucujiformia
- Family: Cerambycidae
- Tribe: Onciderini
- Genus: Taricanus

Genus of beetles

Taricanus is a genus of longhorn beetles of the subfamily Lamiinae, containing the following species:

- Taricanus truquii Thomson, 1868
- Taricanus zaragozai Noguera & Chemsak, 1993
