= Cylicasta liturata =

Scientific classification
- Kingdom: Animalia
- Phylum: Arthropoda
- Class: Insecta
- Order: Coleoptera
- Suborder: Polyphaga
- Infraorder: Cucujiformia
- Family: Cerambycidae
- Genus: Cylicasta
- Species: C. liturata

Binomial name
- Cylicasta liturata (Fabricius, 1801)

Synonyms
- Cylicasta coarctata (Bates, 1865)

Species of beetle

Cylicasta liturata is a species of beetle in the family Cerambycidae. It was described by Johan Christian Fabricius in 1801. It is known from Brazil and French Guiana.
