= Furona =

Scientific classification
- Kingdom: Animalia
- Phylum: Arthropoda
- Class: Insecta
- Order: Coleoptera
- Suborder: Polyphaga
- Infraorder: Cucujiformia
- Family: Cerambycidae
- Tribe: Onciderini
- Genus: Furona

Genus of beetles

Furona is a genus of longhorn beetles of the subfamily Lamiinae, containing the following species:

- Furona corniculata (Bates, 1885)
- Furona degenera (Bates, 1880)
- Furona egens (Erichson, 1847)
