= Delilah gilvicornis =

Scientific classification
- Domain: Eukaryota
- Kingdom: Animalia
- Phylum: Arthropoda
- Class: Insecta
- Order: Coleoptera
- Suborder: Polyphaga
- Infraorder: Cucujiformia
- Family: Cerambycidae
- Genus: Delilah
- Species: D. gilvicornis

Binomial name
- Delilah gilvicornis (Thomson, 1868)

Synonyms
- Hypsioma gilvicornis Thomson, 1868

Species of beetle

Delilah gilvicornis is a species of beetle in the family Cerambycidae. It was described by James Thomson in 1868. It is known from Brazil.
