= Sternycha =

Scientific classification
- Kingdom: Animalia
- Phylum: Arthropoda
- Class: Insecta
- Order: Coleoptera
- Suborder: Polyphaga
- Infraorder: Cucujiformia
- Family: Cerambycidae
- Subfamily: Lamiinae
- Tribe: Onciderini
- Genus: Sternycha; Dillon & Dillon, 1945

Genus of beetles

Sternycha is a genus of longhorn beetles of the subfamily Lamiinae, containing the following species:

- Sternycha approximata Dillon & Dillon, 1945
- Sternycha clivosa Martins & Galileo, 1990
- Sternycha diasi Martins & Galileo, 1990
- Sternycha ecuatoriana Martins & Galileo, 2007
- Sternycha panamensis Martins & Galileo, 1999
- Sternycha paupera (Bates, 1885)
- Sternycha sternalis Dillon & Dillon, 1945
