= Cicatrodea =

Scientific classification
- Kingdom: Animalia
- Phylum: Arthropoda
- Class: Insecta
- Order: Coleoptera
- Suborder: Polyphaga
- Infraorder: Cucujiformia
- Family: Cerambycidae
- Tribe: Onciderini
- Genus: Cicatrodea

Genus of beetles

Cicatrodea is a genus of longhorn beetles of the subfamily Lamiinae, containing the following species:

- Cicatrodea bahia Dillon & Dillon, 1946
- Cicatrodea monima Dillon & Dillon, 1946
