= Glypthaga vicina =

Scientific classification
- Domain: Eukaryota
- Kingdom: Animalia
- Phylum: Arthropoda
- Class: Insecta
- Order: Coleoptera
- Suborder: Polyphaga
- Infraorder: Cucujiformia
- Family: Cerambycidae
- Genus: Glypthaga
- Species: G. vicina

Binomial name
- Glypthaga vicina Martins & Galileo, 1990

Species of beetle

Glypthaga vicina is a species of beetle in the family Cerambycidae. It was described by Martins and Galileo in 1990. It is known from Brazil.
