= Trestonia fulgurata =

Scientific classification
- Domain: Eukaryota
- Kingdom: Animalia
- Phylum: Arthropoda
- Class: Insecta
- Order: Coleoptera
- Suborder: Polyphaga
- Infraorder: Cucujiformia
- Family: Cerambycidae
- Genus: Trestonia
- Species: T. fulgurata

Binomial name
- Trestonia fulgurata Buquet, 1859

Species of beetle

Trestonia fulgurata is a species of beetle in the family Cerambycidae. It was described by Buquet in 1859. It is known from Guadeloupe. It feeds on Inga ingoides.
