= Clavidesmus =

Scientific classification
- Kingdom: Animalia
- Phylum: Arthropoda
- Class: Insecta
- Order: Coleoptera
- Suborder: Polyphaga
- Infraorder: Cucujiformia
- Family: Cerambycidae
- Subfamily: Lamiinae
- Tribe: Onciderini
- Subtribe: Onciderina
- Genus: Clavidesmus; Dillon & Dillon, 1945

Genus of beetles

Clavidesmus is a genus of longhorn beetles of the subfamily Lamiinae, containing the following species:

- Clavidesmus chicae Giorgi, 1998
- Clavidesmus columbianus Breuning, 1961
- Clavidesmus funerarius (Lane, 1958)
- Clavidesmus heterocerus (Buquet, 1852)
- Clavidesmus indistinctus Dillon & Dillon, 1952
- Clavidesmus lichenigerus (Lane, 1958)
- Clavidesmus metallicus (Thomson, 1868)
- Clavidesmus monnei Giorgi, 1998
- Clavidesmus rubigineus Dillon & Dillon, 1949
