= Peritrox denticollis =

Scientific classification
- Kingdom: Animalia
- Phylum: Arthropoda
- Class: Insecta
- Order: Coleoptera
- Suborder: Polyphaga
- Infraorder: Cucujiformia
- Family: Cerambycidae
- Genus: Peritrox
- Species: P. denticollis

Binomial name
- Peritrox denticollis Bates, 1865

Species of beetle

Peritrox denticollis is a species of beetle in the family Cerambycidae. It was described by Henry Walter Bates in 1865. It is known from Uruguay and Brazil.
