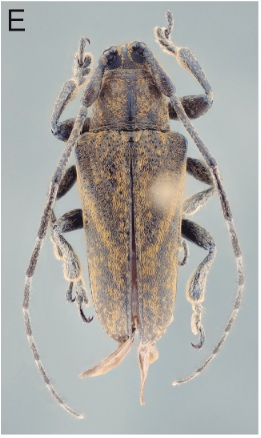

Scientific classification
- Kingdom: Animalia
- Phylum: Arthropoda
- Clade: Pancrustacea
- Class: Insecta
- Order: Coleoptera
- Suborder: Polyphaga
- Infraorder: Cucujiformia
- Family: Cerambycidae
- Genus: Plerodia
- Species: P. syrinx

Binomial name
- Plerodia syrinx (Bates, 1865)

Synonyms
- Hypselomus syrinx Bates, 1865; Hypsioma syrinx Bates, 1865; Plerodia pygmaea Thomson, 1868

= Plerodia syrinx =

Species of beetle

Plerodia syrinx is a species of beetle in the family Cerambycidae. It was described by Henry Walter Bates in 1865. It is known from Paraguay and Brazil (Bahia, Rio de Janeiro, São Paulo, Paraná, Santa Catarina, Rio Grande do Sul).
