= Periergates chiriquensis =

Scientific classification
- Kingdom: Animalia
- Phylum: Arthropoda
- Class: Insecta
- Order: Coleoptera
- Suborder: Polyphaga
- Infraorder: Cucujiformia
- Family: Cerambycidae
- Genus: Periergates
- Species: P. chiriquensis

Binomial name
- Periergates chiriquensis Bates, 1885

Species of beetle

Periergates chiriquensis is a species of beetle in the family Cerambycidae. It was described by Henry Walter Bates in 1885. It is known from Panama.
