= Ischioderes =

Scientific classification
- Kingdom: Animalia
- Phylum: Arthropoda
- Class: Insecta
- Order: Coleoptera
- Suborder: Polyphaga
- Infraorder: Cucujiformia
- Family: Cerambycidae
- Tribe: Onciderini
- Genus: Ischioderes

Genus of beetles

Ischioderes is a genus of longhorn beetles of the subfamily Lamiinae, containing the following species:

- Ischioderes bahiensis Monné & Fragoso, 1984
- Ischioderes oncideroides Dillon & Dillon, 1945
