= Eudesmus nicaraguensis =

Scientific classification
- Kingdom: Animalia
- Phylum: Arthropoda
- Class: Insecta
- Order: Coleoptera
- Suborder: Polyphaga
- Infraorder: Cucujiformia
- Family: Cerambycidae
- Genus: Eudesmus
- Species: E. nicaraguensis

Binomial name
- Eudesmus nicaraguensis Breuning, 1958

Synonyms
- Eudesmus posticalis Guérin-Méneville, 1844

Species of beetle

Eudesmus nicaraguensis is a species of beetle in the family Cerambycidae. It was described by Stephan von Breuning in 1958. It is known from Nicaragua.
