= Bucoides =

Scientific classification
- Kingdom: Animalia
- Phylum: Arthropoda
- Class: Insecta
- Order: Coleoptera
- Suborder: Polyphaga
- Infraorder: Cucujiformia
- Family: Cerambycidae
- Tribe: Onciderini
- Genus: Bucoides

Genus of beetles

Bucoides is a genus of longhorn beetles of the subfamily Lamiinae, containing the following species:

- Bucoides erichsoni Martins, 1979
- Bucoides exotica Martins & Galileo, 1990
- Bucoides montana Martins & Galileo, 2009
