= Tibiosioma maculosa =

Scientific classification
- Kingdom: Animalia
- Phylum: Arthropoda
- Class: Insecta
- Order: Coleoptera
- Suborder: Polyphaga
- Infraorder: Cucujiformia
- Family: Cerambycidae
- Genus: Tibiosioma
- Species: T. maculosa

Binomial name
- Tibiosioma maculosa Martins & Galileo, 2007

Synonyms
- Paraplerodia acarinata Martins & Galileo, 2010

Species of beetle

Tibiosioma maculosa is a species of beetle in the family Cerambycidae. It was described by Martins and Galileo in 2007. It is known from Bolivia.
