= Trestonia capreola =

Scientific classification
- Domain: Eukaryota
- Kingdom: Animalia
- Phylum: Arthropoda
- Class: Insecta
- Order: Coleoptera
- Suborder: Polyphaga
- Infraorder: Cucujiformia
- Family: Cerambycidae
- Genus: Trestonia
- Species: T. capreola

Binomial name
- Trestonia capreola (Germar, 1824)

Species of beetle

Trestonia capreola is a species of beetle in the family Cerambycidae. It was described by Ernst Friedrich Germar in 1824. It is known from Brazil, Argentina and Paraguay.
