= Furona egens =

Scientific classification
- Kingdom: Animalia
- Phylum: Arthropoda
- Class: Insecta
- Order: Coleoptera
- Suborder: Polyphaga
- Infraorder: Cucujiformia
- Family: Cerambycidae
- Genus: Furona
- Species: F. egens

Binomial name
- Furona egens (Erichson, 1847)

Species of beetle

Furona egens is a species of beetle in the family Cerambycidae. It was described by Wilhelm Ferdinand Erichson in 1847. It is known from Ecuador and Peru.
