= Eupalessa =

Scientific classification
- Domain: Eukaryota
- Kingdom: Animalia
- Phylum: Arthropoda
- Class: Insecta
- Order: Coleoptera
- Suborder: Polyphaga
- Infraorder: Cucujiformia
- Family: Cerambycidae
- Tribe: Onciderini
- Genus: Eupalessa; Monné, 2005
- Species: E. attenuata

Binomial name
- Eupalessa attenuata (Thomson, 1868)

Synonyms
- Eupales Dillon & Dillon, 1946 (nec Lefèvre, 1885); Ischiocentra multinotata Melzer, 1934; Oncideres attenuata Thomson, 1868

Genus of beetles

Eupalessa attenuata is a species of beetle in the family Cerambycidae, and the only species in the genus Eupalessa. It was described by James Thomson in 1868. The genus was originally known as Eupales, named by Dillon and Dillon in 1946; however, this name was preoccupied by the leaf beetle genus Eupales Lefèvre, 1885, so it was renamed to Eupalessa by Miguel A. Monné in 2005.
