= Eudesmus ferrugineus =

Scientific classification
- Kingdom: Animalia
- Phylum: Arthropoda
- Class: Insecta
- Order: Coleoptera
- Suborder: Polyphaga
- Infraorder: Cucujiformia
- Family: Cerambycidae
- Genus: Eudesmus
- Species: E. ferrugineus

Binomial name
- Eudesmus ferrugineus (Thomson, 1860)

Species of beetle

Eudesmus ferrugineus is a species of beetle in the family Cerambycidae. It was described by James Thomson in 1860. It is known from Panama, Mexico and South America.
