= Plerodia singularis =

Scientific classification
- Kingdom: Animalia
- Phylum: Arthropoda
- Class: Insecta
- Order: Coleoptera
- Suborder: Polyphaga
- Infraorder: Cucujiformia
- Family: Cerambycidae
- Genus: Plerodia
- Species: P. singularis

Binomial name
- Plerodia singularis Thomson, 1868

Synonyms
- Plerodia spuria Lacordaire, 1872

Species of beetle

Plerodia singularis is a species of beetle in the family Cerambycidae. It was described by James Thomson in 1868. It is known from Brazil and French Guiana.
