= Periergates rodriguezi =

Scientific classification
- Kingdom: Animalia
- Phylum: Arthropoda
- Class: Insecta
- Order: Coleoptera
- Suborder: Polyphaga
- Infraorder: Cucujiformia
- Family: Cerambycidae
- Genus: Periergates
- Species: P. rodriguezi

Binomial name
- Periergates rodriguezi Lacordaire, 1872

Species of beetle

Periergates rodriguezi is a species of beetle in the family Cerambycidae. It was described by Lacordaire in 1872. It is known from Costa Rica and Guatemala.
