= Ischioderes bahiensis =

Scientific classification
- Kingdom: Animalia
- Phylum: Arthropoda
- Class: Insecta
- Order: Coleoptera
- Suborder: Polyphaga
- Infraorder: Cucujiformia
- Family: Cerambycidae
- Genus: Ischioderes
- Species: I. bahiensis

Binomial name
- Ischioderes bahiensis Monné & Fragoso, 1984

Species of beetle

Ischioderes bahiensis is a species of beetle in the family Cerambycidae. It was described by Monné and Fragoso in 1984. It is known from Brazil.
