= Clavidesmus funerarius =

Scientific classification
- Kingdom: Animalia
- Phylum: Arthropoda
- Class: Insecta
- Order: Coleoptera
- Suborder: Polyphaga
- Infraorder: Cucujiformia
- Family: Cerambycidae
- Genus: Clavidesmus
- Species: C. funerarius

Binomial name
- Clavidesmus funerarius (Lane, 1958)

Synonyms
- Orteguaza funeraria Lane, 1958

Species of beetle

Clavidesmus funerarius is a species of beetle in the family Cerambycidae. It was described by Lane in 1958, originally under the genus Orteguaza. It is known from Bolivia.
