= Tibiosioma flavolineata =

Scientific classification
- Kingdom: Animalia
- Phylum: Arthropoda
- Class: Insecta
- Order: Coleoptera
- Suborder: Polyphaga
- Infraorder: Cucujiformia
- Family: Cerambycidae
- Genus: Tibiosioma
- Species: T. flavolineata

Binomial name
- Tibiosioma flavolineata Giorgi, 2001

Species of beetle

Tibiosioma flavolineata is a species of beetle in the family Cerambycidae. It was described by Giorgi in 2001. It is known from Brazil.
