= Cylicasta difficilis =

Scientific classification
- Kingdom: Animalia
- Phylum: Arthropoda
- Class: Insecta
- Order: Coleoptera
- Suborder: Polyphaga
- Infraorder: Cucujiformia
- Family: Cerambycidae
- Genus: Cylicasta
- Species: C. difficilis

Binomial name
- Cylicasta difficilis (Lameere, 1893)

Species of beetle

Cylicasta difficilis is a species of beetle in the family Cerambycidae. It was described by Lameere in 1893. It is known from Venezuela.
