= Furona degenera =

Scientific classification
- Kingdom: Animalia
- Phylum: Arthropoda
- Class: Insecta
- Order: Coleoptera
- Suborder: Polyphaga
- Infraorder: Cucujiformia
- Family: Cerambycidae
- Genus: Furona
- Species: F. degenera

Binomial name
- Furona degenera (Bates, 1880)

Species of beetle

Furona degenera is a species of beetle in the family Cerambycidae. It was described by Henry Walter Bates in 1880. It is known from Colombia, Mexico and Panama.
