= Trestonia bilineata =

Scientific classification
- Domain: Eukaryota
- Kingdom: Animalia
- Phylum: Arthropoda
- Class: Insecta
- Order: Coleoptera
- Suborder: Polyphaga
- Infraorder: Cucujiformia
- Family: Cerambycidae
- Genus: Trestonia
- Species: T. bilineata

Binomial name
- Trestonia bilineata Martins, Galileo & Tavakilian, 2008

Species of beetle

Trestonia bilineata is a species of beetle in the family Cerambycidae. It was described by Martins, Galileo and Tavakilian in 2008. It is known from French Guiana.
