= Psyllotoxus =

Scientific classification
- Kingdom: Animalia
- Phylum: Arthropoda
- Class: Insecta
- Order: Coleoptera
- Suborder: Polyphaga
- Infraorder: Cucujiformia
- Family: Cerambycidae
- Tribe: Onciderini
- Genus: Psyllotoxus

Genus of beetles

Psyllotoxus is a genus of longhorn beetles of the subfamily Lamiinae, containing the following species:

- Psyllotoxus griseocinctus Thomson, 1868
- Psyllotoxus inexpectatus Martins & Galileo, 1990
