= Clavidesmus rubigineus =

Scientific classification
- Kingdom: Animalia
- Phylum: Arthropoda
- Class: Insecta
- Order: Coleoptera
- Suborder: Polyphaga
- Infraorder: Cucujiformia
- Family: Cerambycidae
- Genus: Clavidesmus
- Species: C. rubigineus

Binomial name
- Clavidesmus rubigineus Dillon & Dillon, 1949

Species of beetle

Clavidesmus rubigineus is a species of beetle in the family Cerambycidae. It was described by Dillon and Dillon in 1949. It is known from Brazil.
