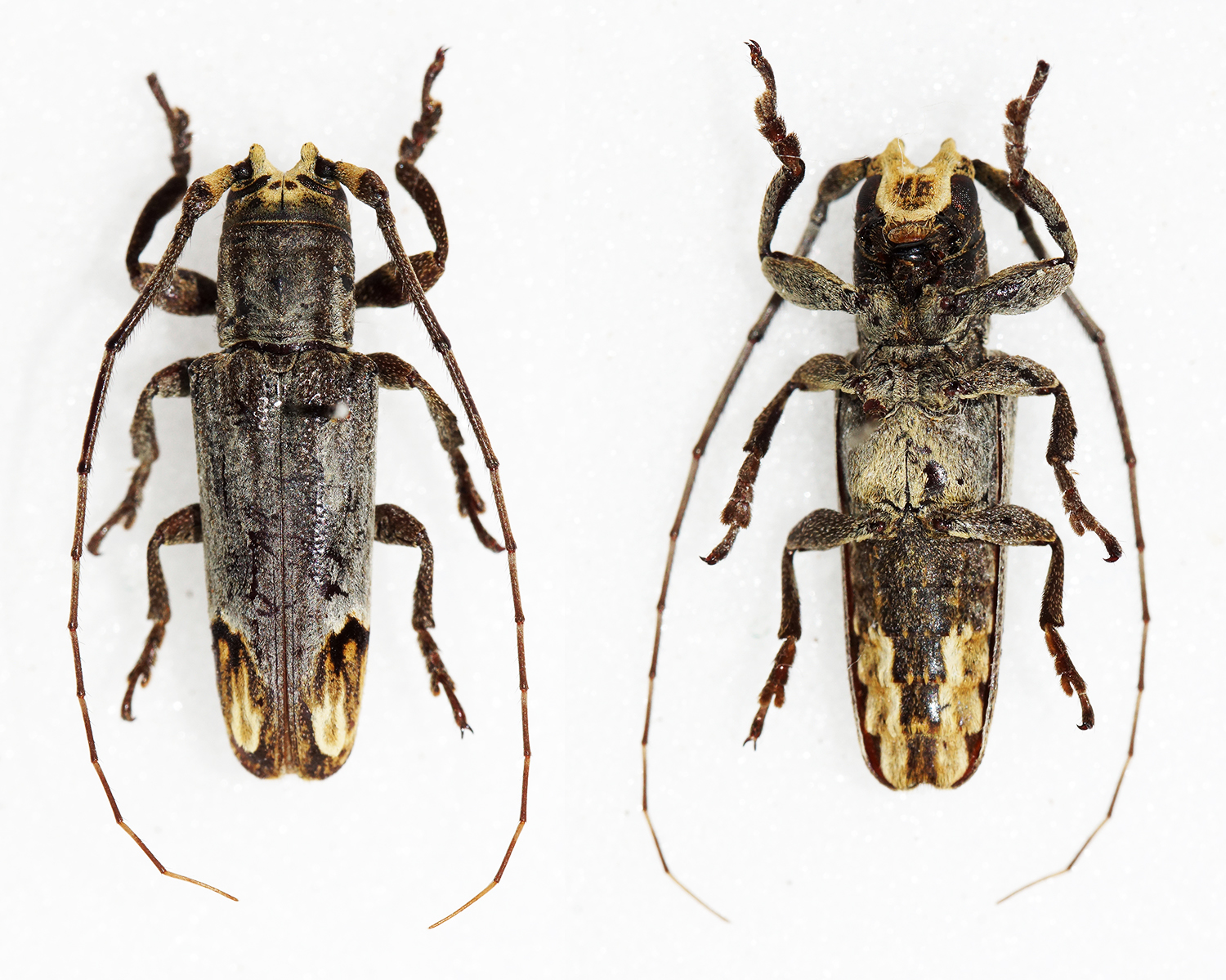

Scientific classification
- Kingdom: Animalia
- Phylum: Arthropoda
- Class: Insecta
- Order: Coleoptera
- Suborder: Polyphaga
- Infraorder: Cucujiformia
- Family: Cerambycidae
- Genus: Trestonia
- Species: T. frontalis

Binomial name
- Trestonia frontalis (Erichson, 1847)

Synonyms
- Trestonia chevrolatii Buquet, 1859; Oncideres frontalis Erichson, 1847

= Trestonia frontalis =

Species of beetle

Trestonia frontalis is a species of beetle in the family Cerambycidae. It was described by Wilhelm Ferdinand Erichson in 1847. It is known from Brazil, Ecuador, Bolivia, Colombia and Peru.
