= Cydros =

Scientific classification
- Kingdom: Animalia
- Phylum: Arthropoda
- Class: Insecta
- Order: Coleoptera
- Suborder: Polyphaga
- Infraorder: Cucujiformia
- Family: Cerambycidae
- Tribe: Onciderini
- Genus: Cydros

Genus of beetles

Cydros is a genus of longhorn beetles of the subfamily Lamiinae, containing the following species:

- Cydros leucurus Pascoe, 1866
- Cydros melzeri Monné & Fragoso, 1984
