= Trestonia turbula =

Scientific classification
- Domain: Eukaryota
- Kingdom: Animalia
- Phylum: Arthropoda
- Class: Insecta
- Order: Coleoptera
- Suborder: Polyphaga
- Infraorder: Cucujiformia
- Family: Cerambycidae
- Genus: Trestonia
- Species: T. turbula

Binomial name
- Trestonia turbula Monné & Fragoso, 1984

Species of beetle

Trestonia turbula is a species of beetle in the family Cerambycidae. It was described by Monné and Fragoso in 1984. It is known from French Guiana, Ecuador, Brazil and Peru.
