= Pseudobeta transversa =

Scientific classification
- Kingdom: Animalia
- Phylum: Arthropoda
- Class: Insecta
- Order: Coleoptera
- Suborder: Polyphaga
- Infraorder: Cucujiformia
- Family: Cerambycidae
- Genus: Pseudobeta
- Species: P. transversa

Binomial name
- Pseudobeta transversa Martins & Galileo, 2010

Species of beetle

Pseudobeta transversa is a species of beetle in the family Cerambycidae. It was described by Martins and Galileo in 2010. It is known from Bolivia.
