= Midamiella santaremensis =

Scientific classification
- Kingdom: Animalia
- Phylum: Arthropoda
- Class: Insecta
- Order: Coleoptera
- Suborder: Polyphaga
- Infraorder: Cucujiformia
- Family: Cerambycidae
- Genus: Midamiella
- Species: M. santaremensis

Binomial name
- Midamiella santaremensis (Dillon & Dillon, 1945)

Species of beetle

Midamiella santaremensis is a species of beetle in the family Cerambycidae. It was described by Dillon and Dillon in 1945. It is known from Brazil.
