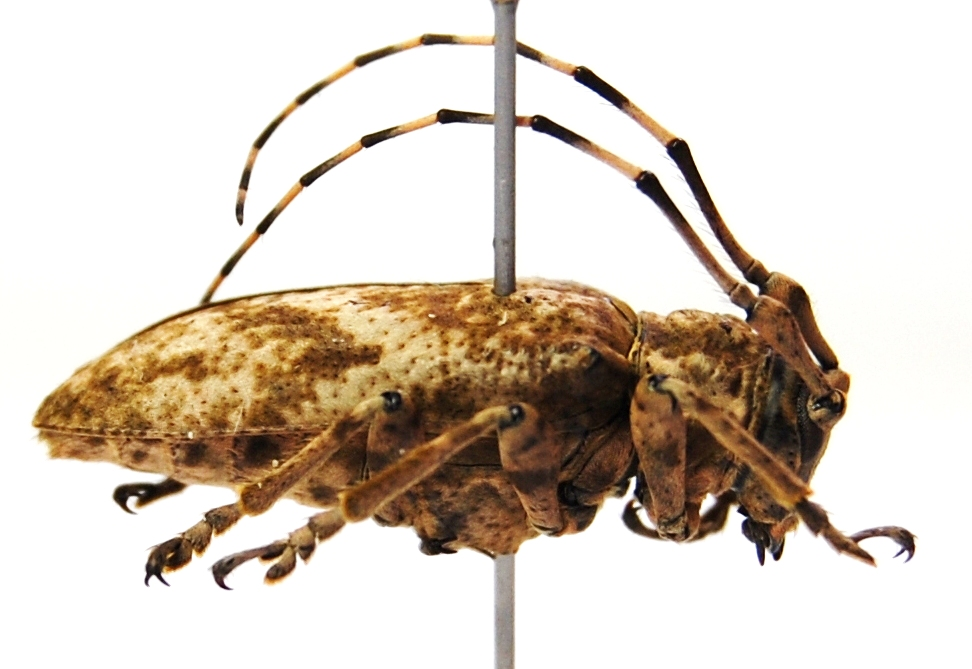

Scientific classification
- Kingdom: Animalia
- Phylum: Arthropoda
- Class: Insecta
- Order: Coleoptera
- Suborder: Polyphaga
- Infraorder: Cucujiformia
- Family: Cerambycidae
- Genus: Midamiella
- Species: M. hecabe

Binomial name
- Midamiella hecabe (Dillon & Dillon, 1945)

= Midamiella hecabe =

Species of beetle

Midamiella hecabe is a species of beetle in the family Cerambycidae. It was described by Dillon and Dillon in 1945. It is known from Argentina, Brazil and Paraguay.
