= Clavidesmus columbianus =

Scientific classification
- Kingdom: Animalia
- Phylum: Arthropoda
- Class: Insecta
- Order: Coleoptera
- Suborder: Polyphaga
- Infraorder: Cucujiformia
- Family: Cerambycidae
- Genus: Clavidesmus
- Species: C. columbianus

Binomial name
- Clavidesmus columbianus Breuning, 1961

Species of beetle

Clavidesmus columbianus is a species of beetle in the family Cerambycidae. It was described by Stephan von Breuning in 1961. It is known from Colombia.
