= Cydros melzeri =

Scientific classification
- Kingdom: Animalia
- Phylum: Arthropoda
- Class: Insecta
- Order: Coleoptera
- Suborder: Polyphaga
- Infraorder: Cucujiformia
- Family: Cerambycidae
- Genus: Cydros
- Species: C. melzeri

Binomial name
- Cydros melzeri Monné & Fragoso, 1984

Species of beetle

Cydros melzeri is a species of beetle in the family Cerambycidae. It was described by Monné and Fragoso in 1984. It is known from Brazil.
