= Eudesmus rubefactus =

Scientific classification
- Kingdom: Animalia
- Phylum: Arthropoda
- Class: Insecta
- Order: Coleoptera
- Suborder: Polyphaga
- Infraorder: Cucujiformia
- Family: Cerambycidae
- Genus: Eudesmus
- Species: E. rubefactus

Binomial name
- Eudesmus rubefactus Bates, 1865

Species of beetle

Eudesmus rubefactus is a species of beetle in the family Cerambycidae. It was described by Henry Walter Bates in 1865. It is known from French Guiana and Brazil.
