= Alexera secunda =

Scientific classification
- Kingdom: Animalia
- Phylum: Arthropoda
- Class: Insecta
- Order: Coleoptera
- Suborder: Polyphaga
- Infraorder: Cucujiformia
- Family: Cerambycidae
- Genus: Alexera
- Species: A. secunda

Binomial name
- Alexera secunda Martins & Galileo, 2007

Species of beetle

Alexera secunda is a species of beetle in the family Cerambycidae. It was described by Martins and Galileo in 2007. It is known from Bolivia. No subspecies are listed in the Catalogue of Life.
