= Pseudobeta doris =

Scientific classification
- Kingdom: Animalia
- Phylum: Arthropoda
- Class: Insecta
- Order: Coleoptera
- Suborder: Polyphaga
- Infraorder: Cucujiformia
- Family: Cerambycidae
- Genus: Pseudobeta
- Species: P. doris

Binomial name
- Pseudobeta doris (Thomson, 1868)

Species of beetle

Pseudobeta doris is a species of beetle in the family Cerambycidae. It was described by James Thomson in 1868. It is known from Brazil.
