= Furona corniculata =

Scientific classification
- Kingdom: Animalia
- Phylum: Arthropoda
- Class: Insecta
- Order: Coleoptera
- Suborder: Polyphaga
- Infraorder: Cucujiformia
- Family: Cerambycidae
- Genus: Furona
- Species: F. corniculata

Binomial name
- Furona corniculata (Bates, 1885)

Synonyms
- Hypsioma corniculata Bates, 1885

Species of beetle

Furona corniculata is a species of beetle in the family Cerambycidae. It was described by Henry Walter Bates in 1885. It is known from Panama and Honduras.
