= Touroultia lordi =

Scientific classification
- Kingdom: Animalia
- Phylum: Arthropoda
- Class: Insecta
- Order: Coleoptera
- Suborder: Polyphaga
- Infraorder: Cucujiformia
- Family: Cerambycidae
- Genus: Touroultia
- Species: T. lordi

Binomial name
- Touroultia lordi Nearns & Tavakilian, 2012

Species of beetle

Touroultia lordi is a species of beetle in the family Cerambycidae. It was described by Nearns and Tavakilian in 2012.
