= Taricanus zaragozai =

Scientific classification
- Kingdom: Animalia
- Phylum: Arthropoda
- Class: Insecta
- Order: Coleoptera
- Suborder: Polyphaga
- Infraorder: Cucujiformia
- Family: Cerambycidae
- Genus: Taricanus
- Species: T. zaragozai

Binomial name
- Taricanus zaragozai Noguera & Chemsak, 1993

Species of beetle

Taricanus zaragozai is a species of beetle in the family Cerambycidae. It was described by Noguera and Chemsak in 1993. It is known from Mexico.
