= Eudesmus caudalis =

Scientific classification
- Kingdom: Animalia
- Phylum: Arthropoda
- Class: Insecta
- Order: Coleoptera
- Suborder: Polyphaga
- Infraorder: Cucujiformia
- Family: Cerambycidae
- Genus: Eudesmus
- Species: E. caudalis

Binomial name
- Eudesmus caudalis Bates, 1865

Species of beetle

Eudesmus caudalis is a species of beetle in the family Cerambycidae. It was described by Henry Walter Bates in 1865.
