= Sternycha paupera =

Scientific classification
- Kingdom: Animalia
- Phylum: Arthropoda
- Class: Insecta
- Order: Coleoptera
- Suborder: Polyphaga
- Infraorder: Cucujiformia
- Family: Cerambycidae
- Genus: Sternycha
- Species: S. paupera

Binomial name
- Sternycha paupera (Bates, 1885)

Species of beetle

Sternycha paupera is a species of beetle in the family Cerambycidae. It was described by Henry Walter Bates in 1885. It is known from Belize and Mexico.
