= Plerodia =

Scientific classification
- Kingdom: Animalia
- Phylum: Arthropoda
- Class: Insecta
- Order: Coleoptera
- Suborder: Polyphaga
- Infraorder: Cucujiformia
- Family: Cerambycidae
- Tribe: Onciderini
- Genus: Plerodia

Genus of beetles

Plerodia is a genus of longhorn beetles of the subfamily Lamiinae, containing the following species:

- Plerodia singularis Thomson, 1868
- Plerodia syrinx (Bates, 1865)
