= Trestonia pyralis =

Scientific classification
- Domain: Eukaryota
- Kingdom: Animalia
- Phylum: Arthropoda
- Class: Insecta
- Order: Coleoptera
- Suborder: Polyphaga
- Infraorder: Cucujiformia
- Family: Cerambycidae
- Genus: Trestonia
- Species: T. pyralis

Binomial name
- Trestonia pyralis Dillon & Dillon, 1946

Species of beetle

Trestonia pyralis is a species of beetle in the family Cerambycidae. It was described by Dillon and Dillon in 1946. It is known from Panama and Costa Rica.
