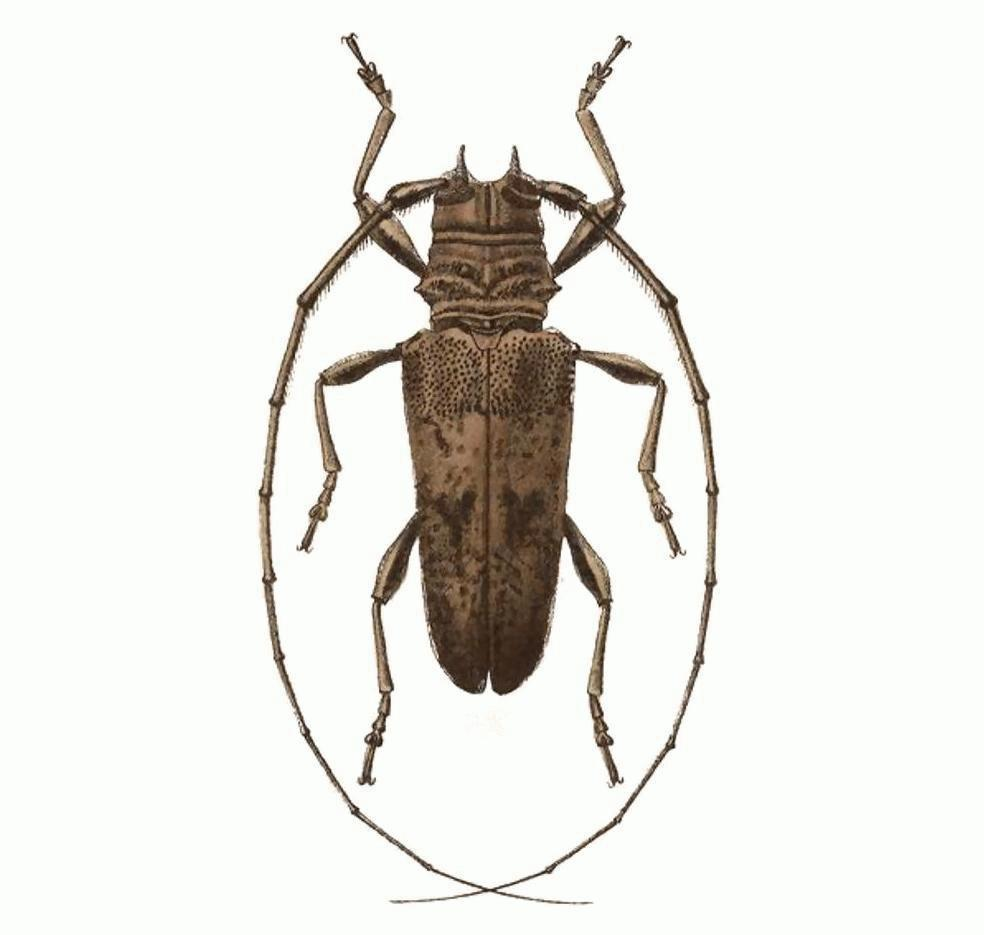
- Tybalmia caeca

Scientific classification
- Kingdom: Animalia
- Phylum: Arthropoda
- Class: Insecta
- Order: Coleoptera
- Suborder: Polyphaga
- Infraorder: Cucujiformia
- Family: Cerambycidae
- Subfamily: Lamiinae
- Tribe: Onciderini
- Subtribe: Onciderina
- Genus: Tybalmia; Thomson, 1868

= Tybalmia =

Genus of beetles

Tybalmia is a genus of longhorn beetles of the subfamily Lamiinae, containing the following species:

- Tybalmia breuningi Dillon & Dillon, 1952
- Tybalmia caeca Bates, 1872
- Tybalmia funeraria Bates, 1880
- Tybalmia ianthe Dillon & Dillon, 1945
- Tybalmia mydas (Lucas in Laporte, 1859)
- Tybalmia orbis Dillon & Dillon, 1945
- Tybalmia pixe Dillon & Dillon, 1945
- Tybalmia pupillata (Pascoe, 1859)
- Tybalmia tetrops Bates, 1872
