= Touroultia =

Scientific classification
- Kingdom: Animalia
- Phylum: Arthropoda
- Class: Insecta
- Order: Coleoptera
- Suborder: Polyphaga
- Infraorder: Cucujiformia
- Family: Cerambycidae
- Tribe: Onciderini
- Genus: Touroultia

Genus of beetles

Touroultia is a genus of longhorn beetles of the subfamily Lamiinae, containing the following species:

- Touroultia lordi Nearns & Tavakilian, 2012
- Touroultia obscurella (Bates, 1865)
- Touroultia swifti Nearns & Tavakilian, 2012
