= Trestoncideres laterialba =

Scientific classification
- Kingdom: Animalia
- Phylum: Arthropoda
- Class: Insecta
- Order: Coleoptera
- Suborder: Polyphaga
- Infraorder: Cucujiformia
- Family: Cerambycidae
- Genus: Trestoncideres
- Species: T. laterialba

Binomial name
- Trestoncideres laterialba Martins & Galileo, 1990

Species of beetle

Trestoncideres laterialba is a species of beetle in the family Cerambycidae. It was described by Martins and Galileo in 1990. It is known from French Guiana, Costa Rica, and Suriname.
