= Trestonia fasciata =

Scientific classification
- Domain: Eukaryota
- Kingdom: Animalia
- Phylum: Arthropoda
- Class: Insecta
- Order: Coleoptera
- Suborder: Polyphaga
- Infraorder: Cucujiformia
- Family: Cerambycidae
- Genus: Trestonia
- Species: T. fasciata

Binomial name
- Trestonia fasciata Martins & Galileo, 1990

Species of beetle

Trestonia fasciata is a species of beetle in the family Cerambycidae. It was described by Martins and Galileo in 1990. It is known from Colombia.
