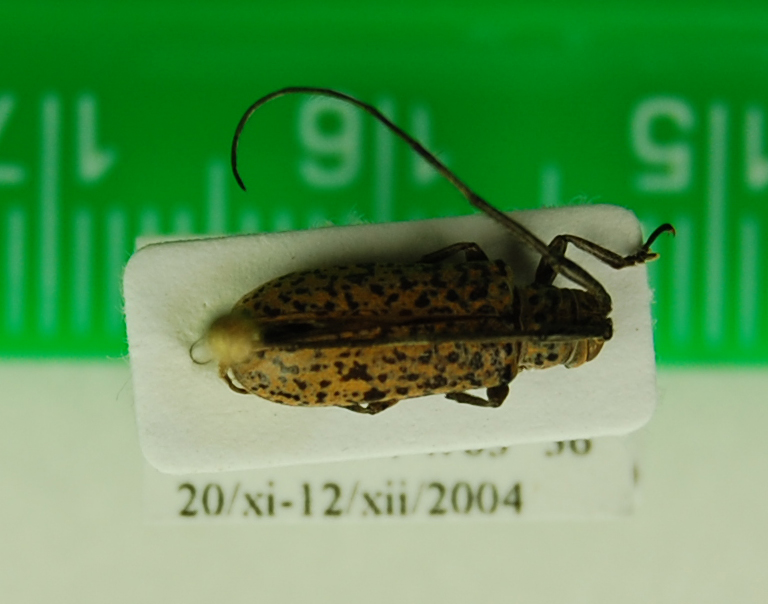

Scientific classification
- Kingdom: Animalia
- Phylum: Arthropoda
- Class: Insecta
- Order: Coleoptera
- Suborder: Polyphaga
- Infraorder: Cucujiformia
- Family: Cerambycidae
- Genus: Peritrox
- Species: P. nigromaculatus

Binomial name
- Peritrox nigromaculatus Aurivillius, 1920

Synonyms
- Peritrox nigromaculata (Aurivillius) Monné, 2005 (misspelling)

= Peritrox nigromaculatus =

Species of beetle

Peritrox nigromaculatus is a species of beetle in the family Cerambycidae. It was described by Per Olof Christopher Aurivillius in 1920. It is known from Paraguay and Brazil.
