= Leus =

Scientific classification
- Kingdom: Animalia
- Phylum: Arthropoda
- Class: Insecta
- Order: Coleoptera
- Suborder: Polyphaga
- Infraorder: Cucujiformia
- Family: Cerambycidae
- Genus: Leus
- Species: L. ramuli

Binomial name
- Leus ramuli (Bates, 1865)

Genus of beetles

Leus ramuli is a species of beetle in the family Cerambycidae, and the only species in the genus Leus. It can be identified by its tan and brown spotted body. It was described by Henry Walter Bates in 1865.
