= Neocherentes =

Scientific classification
- Kingdom: Animalia
- Phylum: Arthropoda
- Class: Insecta
- Order: Coleoptera
- Suborder: Polyphaga
- Infraorder: Cucujiformia
- Family: Cerambycidae
- Genus: Neocherentes
- Species: N. dilloniorum

Binomial name
- Neocherentes dilloniorum Tippmann, 1960

Genus of beetles

Neocherentes dilloniorum is a species of beetle in the family Cerambycidae, and the only species in the genus Neocherentes. It was described by Tippmann in 1960.
