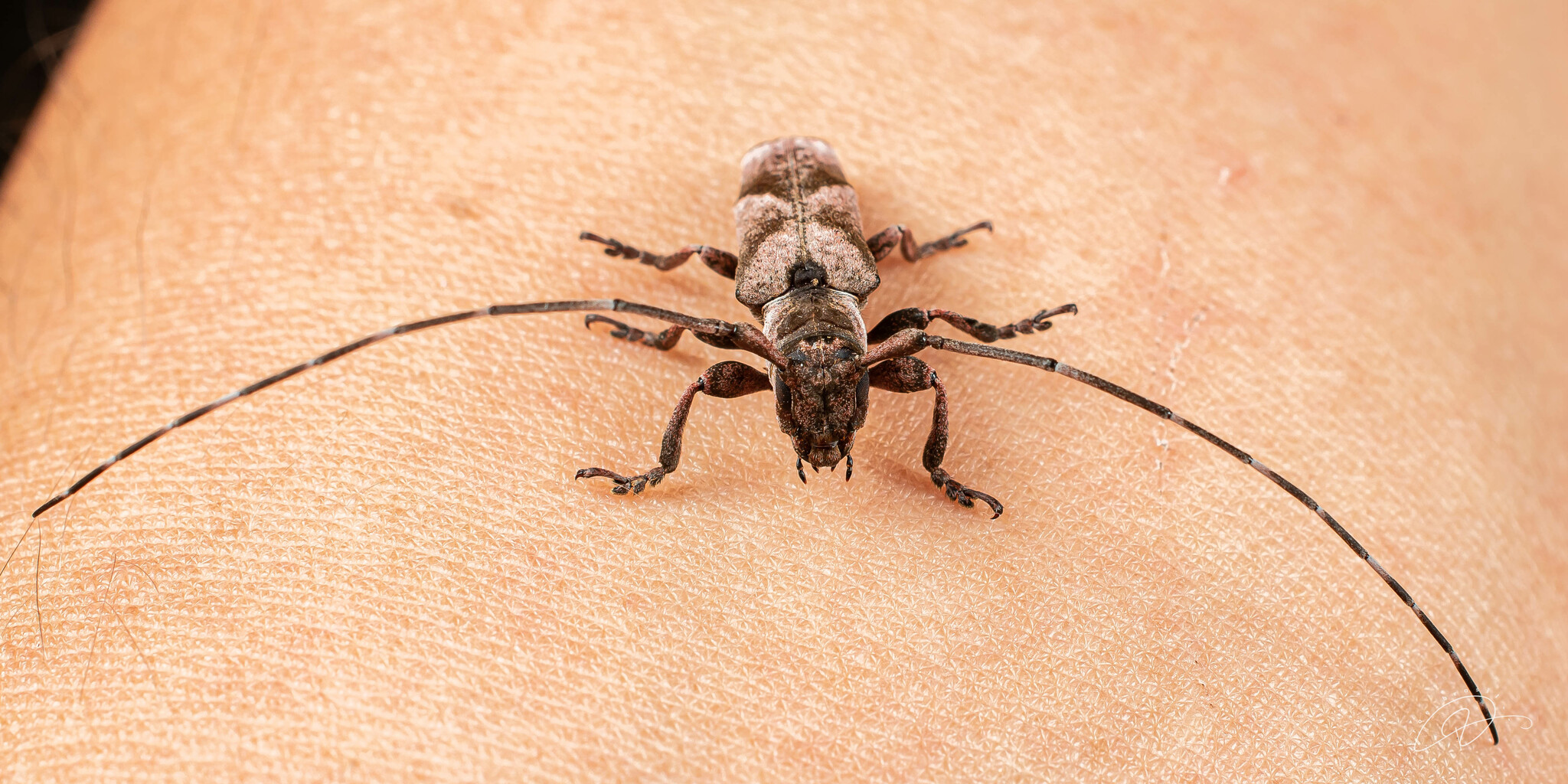

Scientific classification
- Domain: Eukaryota
- Kingdom: Animalia
- Phylum: Arthropoda
- Class: Insecta
- Order: Coleoptera
- Suborder: Polyphaga
- Infraorder: Cucujiformia
- Family: Cerambycidae
- Genus: Chitron; Dillon & Dillon, 1945
- Species: C. mniszechi

Binomial name
- Chitron mniszechi (Buquet, 1859)

Synonyms
- List (Species): Chitron mniszechi Di Iorio, 2004; Chitron mniszechi Monné & Giesbert, 1994; Trestonia mniszechi Aurivillius, 1923; Trestonia mniszechi Blackwelder, 1946; Trestonia mniszechi Gemminger & Harold, 1873; Trestonia mniszechi Lima, 1947; Trestonia mniszechii Buquet, 1859; Trestonia mniszechii Lacordaire, 1872; Trestonia mniszechy Zikán & Zikán, 1944; Trestonia mniszeckii Thomson, 1868

= Chitron =

Chitron mniszechii

Genus of beetles

Chitron is a genus of beetles in the family Cerambycidae. It is monotypic, being represented by the single species Chitron mniszechii.
