= Marensis =

Scientific classification
- Kingdom: Animalia
- Phylum: Arthropoda
- Class: Insecta
- Order: Coleoptera
- Suborder: Polyphaga
- Infraorder: Cucujiformia
- Family: Cerambycidae
- Genus: Marensis
- Species: M. simplex

Binomial name
- Marensis simplex (Bates, 1865)

Genus of beetles

Marensis simplex is a species of beetle in the family Cerambycidae, and the only species in the genus Marensis. It was described by Henry Walter Bates in 1865.
