= Cherentes =

Scientific classification
- Kingdom: Animalia
- Phylum: Arthropoda
- Class: Insecta
- Order: Coleoptera
- Suborder: Polyphaga
- Infraorder: Cucujiformia
- Family: Cerambycidae
- Genus: Cherentes
- Species: C. niveilateris

Binomial name
- Cherentes niveilateris (Thomson, 1868)

Genus of beetles

Cherentes niveilateris is a species of beetle in the family Cerambycidae, and the only species in the genus Cherentes. It was described by Thomson in 1868.
