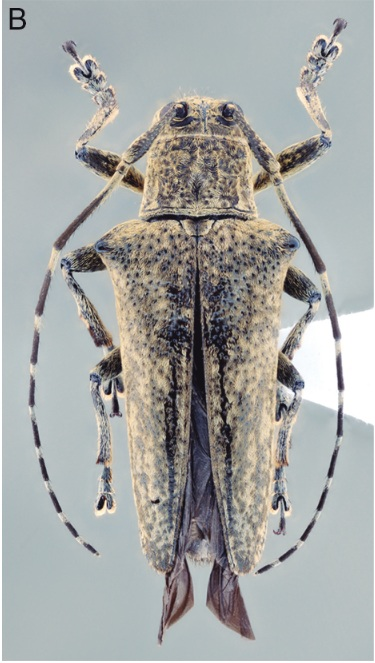

Scientific classification
- Kingdom: Animalia
- Phylum: Arthropoda
- Clade: Pancrustacea
- Class: Insecta
- Order: Coleoptera
- Suborder: Polyphaga
- Infraorder: Cucujiformia
- Family: Cerambycidae
- Genus: Agaritha; Dillon & Dillon, 1945
- Species: A. iolaia

Binomial name
- Agaritha iolaia Dillon & Dillon, 1945

= Agaritha =

Genus of beetles

Agaritha iolaia is a species of beetle in the family Cerambycidae, and the only species in the genus Agaritha. It was described by Dillon and Dillon in 1945. It is found in Brazil (Rio de Janeiro, São Paulo, Paraná, Santa Catarina, Rio Grande do Sul) and Argentina.
