= Ephiales =

Scientific classification
- Kingdom: Animalia
- Phylum: Arthropoda
- Class: Insecta
- Order: Coleoptera
- Suborder: Polyphaga
- Infraorder: Cucujiformia
- Family: Cerambycidae
- Genus: Ephiales
- Species: E. cretacea

Binomial name
- Ephiales cretacea (Bates, 1865)

Genus of beetles

Ephiales cretacea is a species of beetle in the family Cerambycidae, and the only species in the genus Ephiales. It was described by Henry Walter Bates in 1865.
