= Tritania =

Scientific classification
- Kingdom: Animalia
- Phylum: Arthropoda
- Class: Insecta
- Order: Coleoptera
- Suborder: Polyphaga
- Infraorder: Cucujiformia
- Family: Cerambycidae
- Genus: Tritania
- Species: T. dilloni

Binomial name
- Tritania dilloni Chalumeau, 1990

Genus of beetles

Tritania dilloni is a species of beetle in the family Cerambycidae, and the only species in the genus Tritania. It was described by Chalumeau in 1990.
