= Prohylus =

Scientific classification
- Kingdom: Animalia
- Phylum: Arthropoda
- Class: Insecta
- Order: Coleoptera
- Suborder: Polyphaga
- Infraorder: Cucujiformia
- Family: Cerambycidae
- Genus: Prohylus
- Species: P. phanthasma

Binomial name
- Prohylus phanthasma Martins & Galileo, 1990

Genus of beetles

Prohylus phanthasma is a species of beetle in the family Cerambycidae, and the only species in the genus Prohylus. It was described by Martins and Galileo in 1990.
