= Esonius =

Scientific classification
- Kingdom: Animalia
- Phylum: Arthropoda
- Class: Insecta
- Order: Coleoptera
- Suborder: Polyphaga
- Infraorder: Cucujiformia
- Family: Cerambycidae
- Genus: Esonius
- Species: E. panopus

Binomial name
- Esonius panopus Dillon & Dillon, 1945

Genus of beetles

Esonius panopus is a species of beetle in the family Cerambycidae, and the only species in the genus Esonius. It was described by Dillon and Dillon in 1945.
