= Iaquira =

Scientific classification
- Kingdom: Animalia
- Phylum: Arthropoda
- Class: Insecta
- Order: Coleoptera
- Suborder: Polyphaga
- Infraorder: Cucujiformia
- Family: Cerambycidae
- Genus: Iaquira
- Species: I. viridis

Binomial name
- Iaquira viridis Galileo & Martins, 2001

Genus of beetles

Iaquira viridis is a species of beetle in the family Cerambycidae, and the only species in the genus Iaquira. It was described by Galileo and Martins in 2001. Iaquira viridis is a beetle species found in Brazil. It is endemic to the state of Espírito Santo.
