= Cnemosioma =

Scientific classification
- Kingdom: Animalia
- Phylum: Arthropoda
- Class: Insecta
- Order: Coleoptera
- Suborder: Polyphaga
- Infraorder: Cucujiformia
- Family: Cerambycidae
- Genus: Cnemosioma
- Species: C. innominata

Binomial name
- Cnemosioma innominata Martins, 1975

Genus of beetles

Cnemosioma innominata is a species of beetle in the family Cerambycidae, and the only species in the genus Cnemosioma. It was described by Martins in 1975.
