= Xylomimus =

Scientific classification
- Kingdom: Animalia
- Phylum: Arthropoda
- Class: Insecta
- Order: Coleoptera
- Suborder: Polyphaga
- Infraorder: Cucujiformia
- Family: Cerambycidae
- Genus: Xylomimus
- Species: X. baculus

Binomial name
- Xylomimus baculus Bates, 1865

Genus of beetles

Xylomimus baculus is a species of beetle in the family Cerambycidae, and the only species in the genus Xylomimus. It was described by Henry Walter Bates in 1865.
