= Typhlocerus =

Scientific classification
- Kingdom: Animalia
- Phylum: Arthropoda
- Class: Insecta
- Order: Coleoptera
- Suborder: Polyphaga
- Infraorder: Cucujiformia
- Family: Cerambycidae
- Genus: Typhlocerus
- Species: T. prodigiosus

Binomial name
- Typhlocerus prodigiosus (Thomson, 1868)

Genus of beetles

Typhlocerus prodigiosus is a species of beetle in the family Cerambycidae, and the only species in the genus Typhlocerus. It was described by Thomson in 1868.
