= Paratrachysomus =

Scientific classification
- Kingdom: Animalia
- Phylum: Arthropoda
- Class: Insecta
- Order: Coleoptera
- Suborder: Polyphaga
- Infraorder: Cucujiformia
- Family: Cerambycidae
- Genus: Paratrachysomus
- Species: P. huedepohli

Binomial name
- Paratrachysomus huedepohli Monné & Fragoso, 1984

Genus of beetles

Paratrachysomus huedepohli is a species of beetle in the family Cerambycidae, and the only species in the genus Paratrachysomus. It was described by Monné and Fragoso in 1984.
