= Psyllotoxoides =

Scientific classification
- Kingdom: Animalia
- Phylum: Arthropoda
- Class: Insecta
- Order: Coleoptera
- Suborder: Polyphaga
- Infraorder: Cucujiformia
- Family: Cerambycidae
- Genus: Psyllotoxoides
- Species: P. albomaculata

Binomial name
- Psyllotoxoides albomaculata Breuning, 1961

Genus of beetles

Psyllotoxoides albomaculata is a species of beetle in the family Cerambycidae, and the only species in the genus Psyllotoxoides. It was described by Stephan von Breuning in 1961.
