= Lachaerus =

Scientific classification
- Kingdom: Animalia
- Phylum: Arthropoda
- Class: Insecta
- Order: Coleoptera
- Suborder: Polyphaga
- Infraorder: Cucujiformia
- Family: Cerambycidae
- Genus: Lachaerus
- Species: L. fascinus

Binomial name
- Lachaerus fascinus (Audinet-Serville, 1835)

Genus of beetles

Lachaerus fascinus is a species of beetle in the family Cerambycidae, and the only species in the genus Lachaerus. It was described by Audinet-Serville in 1835.
