= Apocoptoma =

Scientific classification
- Kingdom: Animalia
- Phylum: Arthropoda
- Class: Insecta
- Order: Coleoptera
- Suborder: Polyphaga
- Infraorder: Cucujiformia
- Family: Cerambycidae
- Genus: Apocoptoma
- Species: A. chabrillaci

Binomial name
- Apocoptoma chabrillaci Thomson, 1857

Genus of beetles

Apocoptoma chabrillaci is a species of beetle in the family Cerambycidae, and the only species in the genus Apocoptoma. It was described by Thomson in 1857.
