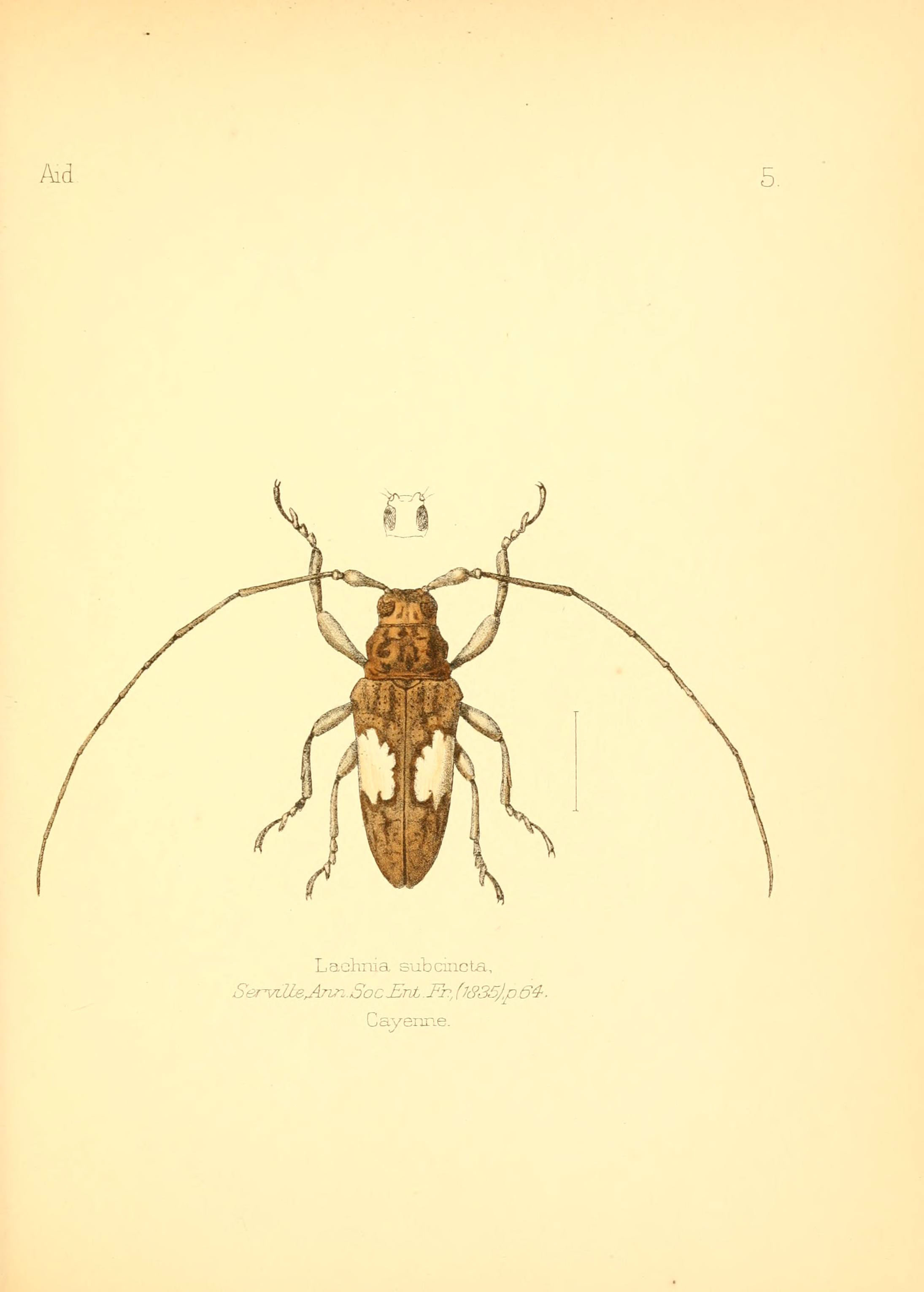

Scientific classification
- Kingdom: Animalia
- Phylum: Arthropoda
- Class: Insecta
- Order: Coleoptera
- Suborder: Polyphaga
- Infraorder: Cucujiformia
- Family: Cerambycidae
- Genus: Lachnia
- Species: L. subcincta

Binomial name
- Lachnia subcincta Audinet-Serville, 1835

= Lachnia =

Genus of beetles

Lachnia subcincta is a species of beetle in the family Cerambycidae, and the only species in the genus Lachnia. It was described by Jean Guillaume Audinet-Serville in 1835.
