= Ecthoea =

Scientific classification
- Kingdom: Animalia
- Phylum: Arthropoda
- Class: Insecta
- Order: Coleoptera
- Suborder: Polyphaga
- Infraorder: Cucujiformia
- Family: Cerambycidae
- Genus: Ecthoea
- Species: E. quadricornis

Binomial name
- Ecthoea quadricornis (Olivier, 1792)

Genus of beetles

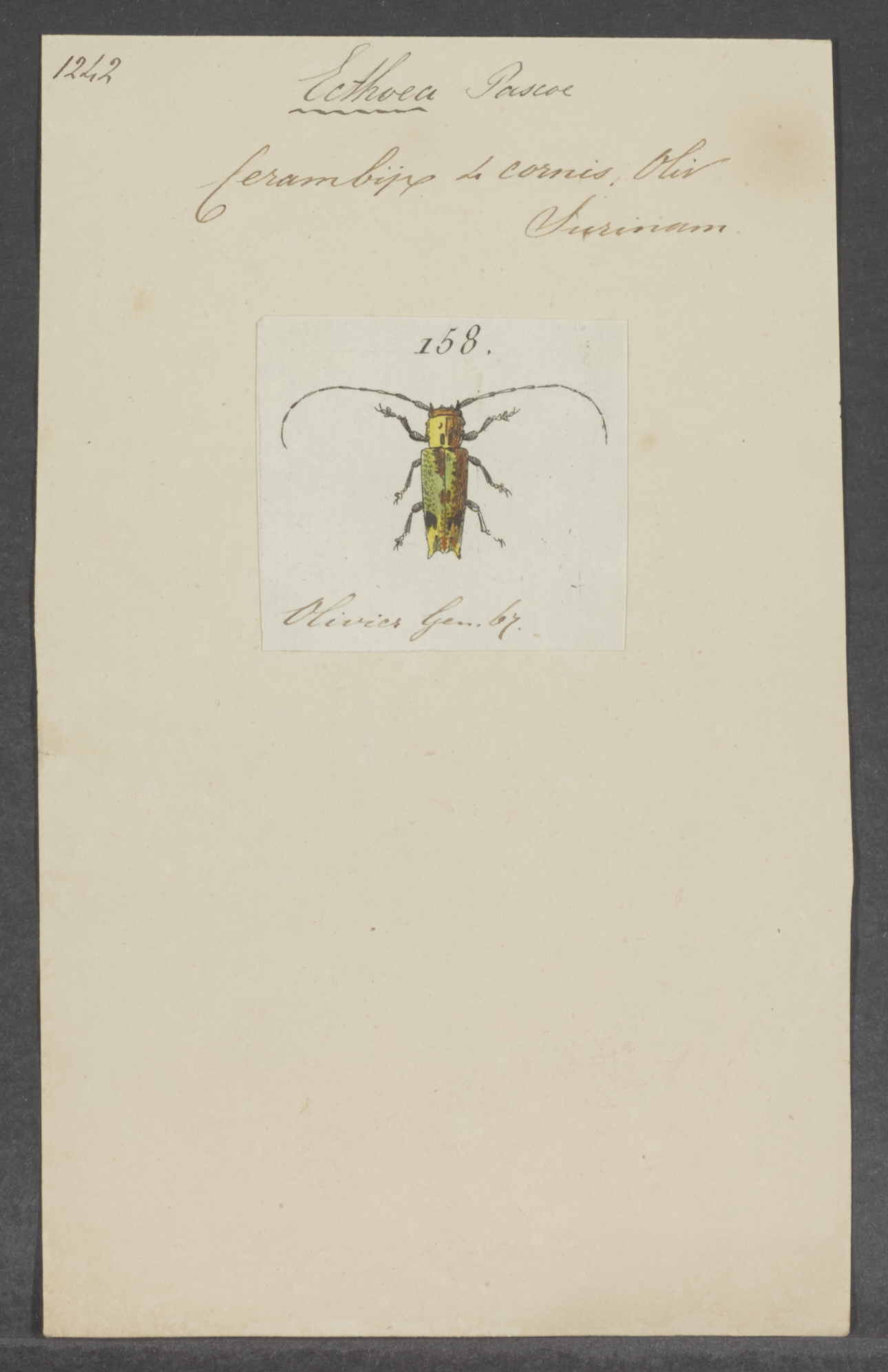
Ecthoea - Print - Iconographia Zoologica - Special Collections University of Amsterdam. No date.

Ecthoea quadricornis is a species of beetle in the family Cerambycidae, and the only species in the genus Ecthoea. It was described by Guillaume-Antoine Olivier in 1792.
