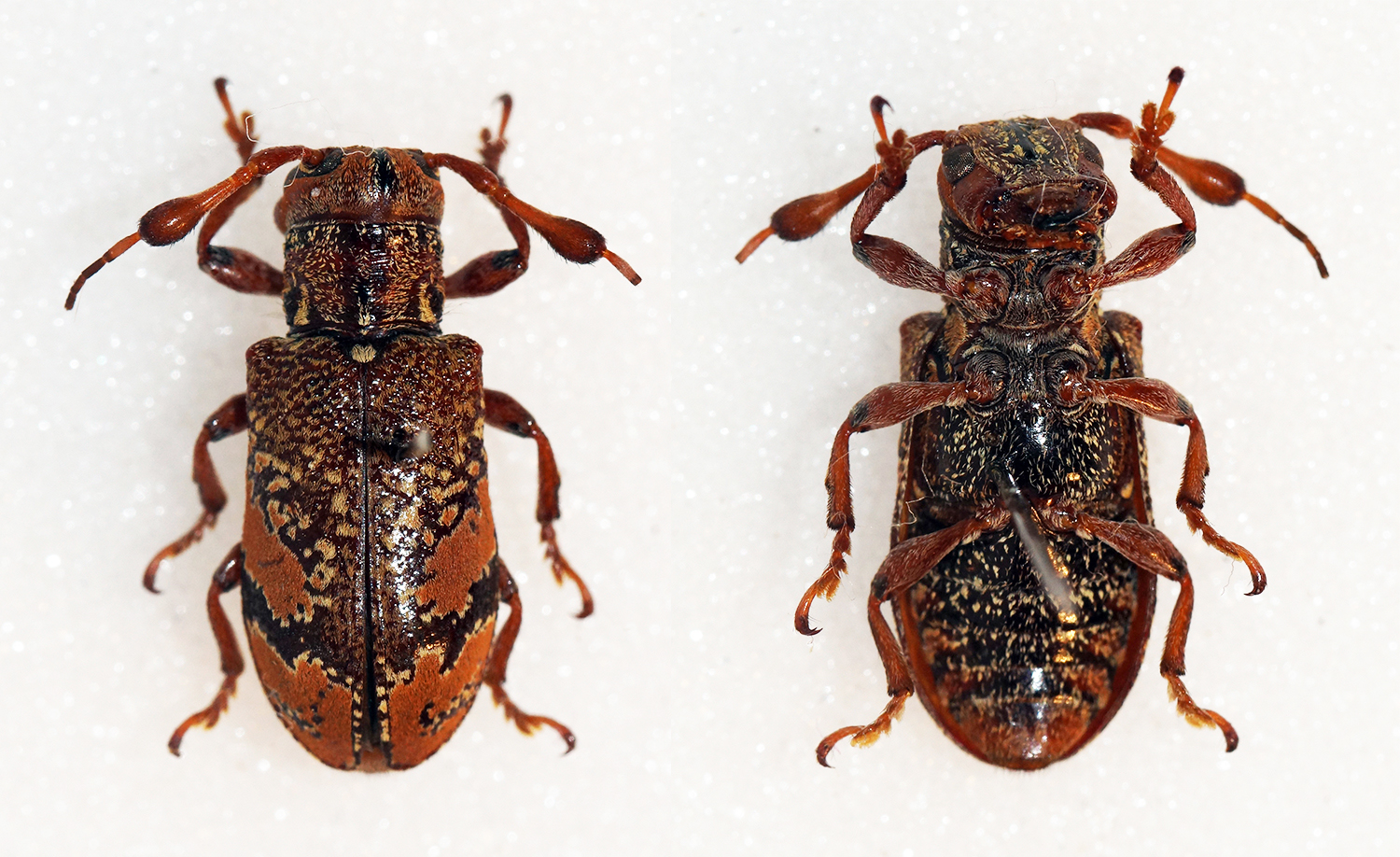

Scientific classification
- Kingdom: Animalia
- Phylum: Arthropoda
- Class: Insecta
- Order: Coleoptera
- Suborder: Polyphaga
- Infraorder: Cucujiformia
- Family: Cerambycidae
- Genus: Strioderes
- Species: S. peruanus

Binomial name
- Strioderes peruanus Giorgi, 2001

= Strioderes =

Genus of beetles

Strioderes peruanus is a species of beetle in the family Cerambycidae, and the only species in the genus Strioderes. It was described by Giorgi in 2001.
