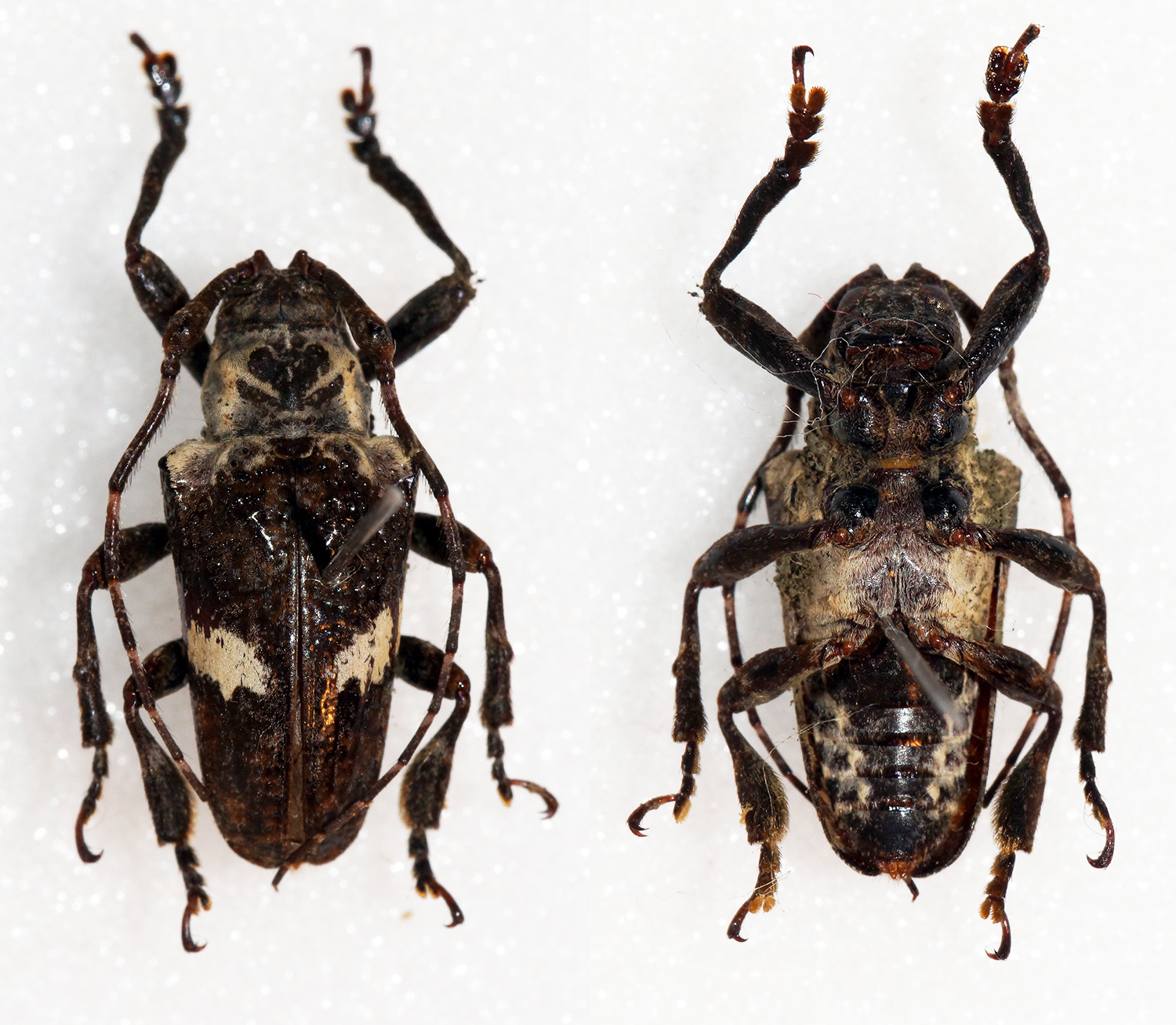

Scientific classification
- Kingdom: Animalia
- Phylum: Arthropoda
- Class: Insecta
- Order: Coleoptera
- Suborder: Polyphaga
- Infraorder: Cucujiformia
- Family: Cerambycidae
- Genus: Cipriscola
- Species: C. fasciata

Binomial name
- Cipriscola fasciata (Thomson, 1860)

= Cipriscola =

Genus of beetles

Cipriscola fasciata is a species of beetle in the family Cerambycidae, and the only species in the genus Cipriscola. It was described by Thomson in 1860.
