= Microcanus =

Scientific classification
- Kingdom: Animalia
- Phylum: Arthropoda
- Class: Insecta
- Order: Coleoptera
- Suborder: Polyphaga
- Infraorder: Cucujiformia
- Family: Cerambycidae
- Genus: Microcanus
- Species: M. minor

Binomial name
- Microcanus minor (Bates, 1885)

Genus of beetles

Microcanus minor is a species of beetle in the family Cerambycidae, and the only species in the genus Microcanus. It was described by Henry Walter Bates in 1885.
