= Priscatoides =

Scientific classification
- Kingdom: Animalia
- Phylum: Arthropoda
- Class: Insecta
- Order: Coleoptera
- Suborder: Polyphaga
- Infraorder: Cucujiformia
- Family: Cerambycidae
- Genus: Priscatoides
- Species: P. tatila

Binomial name
- Priscatoides tatila Dillon & Dillon, 1945

Genus of beetles

Priscatoides tatila is a species of beetle in the family Cerambycidae, and the only species in the genus Priscatoides. It was described by Dillon and Dillon in 1945.
