= Hypsiomatina =

Scientific classification
- Domain: Eukaryota
- Kingdom: Animalia
- Phylum: Arthropoda
- Class: Insecta
- Order: Coleoptera
- Suborder: Polyphaga
- Infraorder: Cucujiformia
- Family: Cerambycidae
- Tribe: Onciderini
- Subtribe: Hypsiomatina; Thomson, 1860

Genera
- (see text)

Synonyms
- Hypsiomitae Thomson, 1860; Onocephalitae Thomson, 1860; Hypselominae Pascoe, 1864

Subtribe of beetles

Hypsiomatina is a subtribe of longhorn beetles of the tribe Onciderini, containing the following genera:

- Cordites
- Euthima
- Furona
- Hesycha
- Hypselomus
- Hypsioma
- Ischiocentra
- Lingafelteria
- Lydipta
- Midamiella
- Neodillonia
- Onocephala
- Pseudoperma
- Sternycha
- Stethoperma
- Sulpitus
- Tulcus
- Venustus
