= Euthima variegata =

Scientific classification
- Kingdom: Animalia
- Phylum: Arthropoda
- Class: Insecta
- Order: Coleoptera
- Suborder: Polyphaga
- Infraorder: Cucujiformia
- Family: Cerambycidae
- Tribe: Onciderini
- Subtribe: Hypsiomatina
- Genus: Euthima
- Species: E. variegata

Binomial name
- Euthima variegata (Aurivillius, 1921)

Synonyms
- Plerodia variegata Aurivillius, 1921; Euthima wendtae Martins, 1979

Species of beetle

Euthima variegata is a species of beetle in the family Cerambycidae. It was described by Per Olof Christopher Aurivillius in 1921. It is known from Bolivia, Peru and Ecuador.
