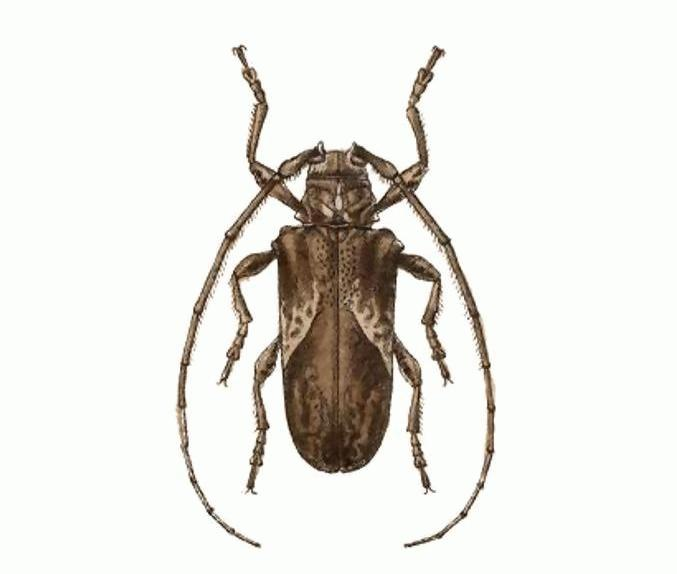
- Ischiocentra heraldica

Scientific classification
- Kingdom: Animalia
- Phylum: Arthropoda
- Clade: Pancrustacea
- Class: Insecta
- Order: Coleoptera
- Suborder: Polyphaga
- Infraorder: Cucujiformia
- Family: Cerambycidae
- Subtribe: Hypsiomatina
- Genus: Ischiocentra; Thomson, 1860

= Ischiocentra =

Genus of beetles

Ischiocentra is a genus of longhorn beetles of the subfamily Lamiinae, containing the following species:

- Ischiocentra clavata Thomson, 1860
- Ischiocentra diringshofeni Lane, 1956
- Ischiocentra disjuncta Martins & Galileo, 1990
- Ischiocentra hebes (Thomson, 1868)
- Ischiocentra monteverdensis Giesbert, 1984
- Ischiocentra nobilitata Thomson, 1868
- Ischiocentra punctata Martins & Galileo, 2005
- Ischiocentra quadrisignata Thomson, 1868
- Ischiocentra stockwelli Giesbert, 1984
