= Euthima araujoi =

Scientific classification
- Domain: Eukaryota
- Kingdom: Animalia
- Phylum: Arthropoda
- Class: Insecta
- Order: Coleoptera
- Suborder: Polyphaga
- Infraorder: Cucujiformia
- Family: Cerambycidae
- Tribe: Onciderini
- Subtribe: Hypsiomatina
- Genus: Euthima
- Species: E. araujoi

Binomial name
- Euthima araujoi Martins, 1979

Species of beetle

Euthima araujoi is a species of beetle in the family Cerambycidae. It was described by Martins in 1979. It is known from Brazil.
