= Clytemnestra (disambiguation) =

Clytemnestra is a figure from Greek mythology.

Clytemnestra may also refer to:

== Arts, entertainment, and media ==
- Clytemnestra (Collier), a 1882 oil painting by John Collier
- Clytemnestra (dance), a 1958 ballet by Martha Graham
- Clytemnestra Sutpen, a fictitious character in the 1936 novel Absalom, Absalom!

== Other uses ==
- Clytemnestra adspersa, synonymous to a species of beetles Neodillonia albisparsa.
