= Neolampedusa lateralis =

Scientific classification
- Kingdom: Animalia
- Phylum: Arthropoda
- Class: Insecta
- Order: Coleoptera
- Suborder: Polyphaga
- Infraorder: Cucujiformia
- Family: Cerambycidae
- Genus: Neolampedusa
- Species: N. lateralis

Binomial name
- Neolampedusa lateralis (Thomson, 1868)

Synonyms
- Hesycha lateralis Thomson, 1868; Lampedusa obliquator (Fabricius) Dillon & Dillon, 1945

Species of beetle

Neolampedusa lateralis is a species of beetle in the family Cerambycidae. It was described by James Thomson in 1868, originally under the genus Hesycha. It is known from French Guiana.
