= Euthima rodens =

Scientific classification
- Domain: Eukaryota
- Kingdom: Animalia
- Phylum: Arthropoda
- Class: Insecta
- Order: Coleoptera
- Suborder: Polyphaga
- Infraorder: Cucujiformia
- Family: Cerambycidae
- Tribe: Onciderini
- Subtribe: Hypsiomatina
- Genus: Euthima
- Species: E. rodens

Binomial name
- Euthima rodens (Bates, 1865)

Species of beetle

Euthima rodens is a species of beetle in the family Cerambycidae. It was described by Henry Walter Bates in 1865. It is known from Peru, French Guiana, Brazil, Ecuador and Bolivia.
