= Cordites pubescens =

Scientific classification
- Kingdom: Animalia
- Phylum: Arthropoda
- Class: Insecta
- Order: Coleoptera
- Suborder: Polyphaga
- Infraorder: Cucujiformia
- Family: Cerambycidae
- Genus: Cordites
- Species: C. pubescens

Binomial name
- Cordites pubescens (Thomson, 1868)

Synonyms
- Apamauta pubescens Thomson, 1868; Ischiocentra modesta Melzer, 1931

Species of beetle

Cordites pubescens is a species of beetle in the family Cerambycidae. It was described by James Thomson in 1868, originally under the genus Apamauta. It is known from Brazil.
