= Onocephala rugicollis =

Scientific classification
- Domain: Eukaryota
- Kingdom: Animalia
- Phylum: Arthropoda
- Class: Insecta
- Order: Coleoptera
- Suborder: Polyphaga
- Infraorder: Cucujiformia
- Family: Cerambycidae
- Genus: Onocephala
- Species: O. rugicollis

Binomial name
- Onocephala rugicollis Thomson, 1857

Species of beetle

Onocephala rugicollis is a species of beetle in the family Cerambycidae. It was described by James Thomson in 1857.
