= Venustus analogus =

Scientific classification
- Kingdom: Animalia
- Phylum: Arthropoda
- Class: Insecta
- Order: Coleoptera
- Suborder: Polyphaga
- Infraorder: Cucujiformia
- Family: Cerambycidae
- Genus: Venustus
- Species: V. analogus

Binomial name
- Venustus analogus Martins & Galileo, 1996

Species of beetle

Venustus analogus is a species of beetle in the family Cerambycidae. It was described by Martins and Galileo in 1996. It is known from Colombia.
