= Hesycha variabilis =

Scientific classification
- Kingdom: Animalia
- Phylum: Arthropoda
- Class: Insecta
- Order: Coleoptera
- Suborder: Polyphaga
- Infraorder: Cucujiformia
- Family: Cerambycidae
- Genus: Hesycha
- Species: H. variabilis

Binomial name
- Hesycha variabilis Dillon & Dillon, 1945

Species of beetle

Hesycha variabilis is a species of beetle in the family Cerambycidae. It was described by Dillon and Dillon in 1945. It is known from Argentina, Brazil and Paraguay.
