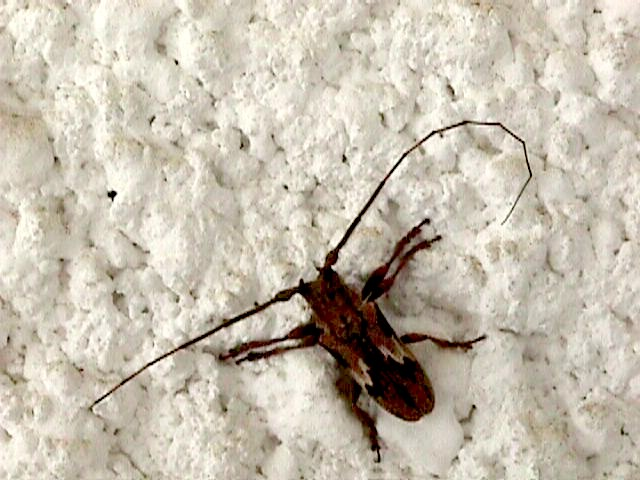

Scientific classification
- Kingdom: Animalia
- Phylum: Arthropoda
- Class: Insecta
- Order: Coleoptera
- Suborder: Polyphaga
- Infraorder: Cucujiformia
- Family: Cerambycidae
- Genus: Hesychotypa
- Species: H. aeropa

Binomial name
- Hesychotypa aeropa Dillon & Dillon, 1945

= Hesychotypa aeropa =

Species of beetle

Hesychotypa aeropa is a species of beetle in the family Cerambycidae. It was described by Dillon and Dillon in 1945. It is known from Bolivia.
