= Onocephala lineola =

Scientific classification
- Domain: Eukaryota
- Kingdom: Animalia
- Phylum: Arthropoda
- Class: Insecta
- Order: Coleoptera
- Suborder: Polyphaga
- Infraorder: Cucujiformia
- Family: Cerambycidae
- Genus: Onocephala
- Species: O. lineola

Binomial name
- Onocephala lineola Dillon & Dillon, 1946

Species of beetle

Onocephala lineola is a species of beetle in the family Cerambycidae. It was described by Dillon and Dillon in 1946. It is known from Brazil.
