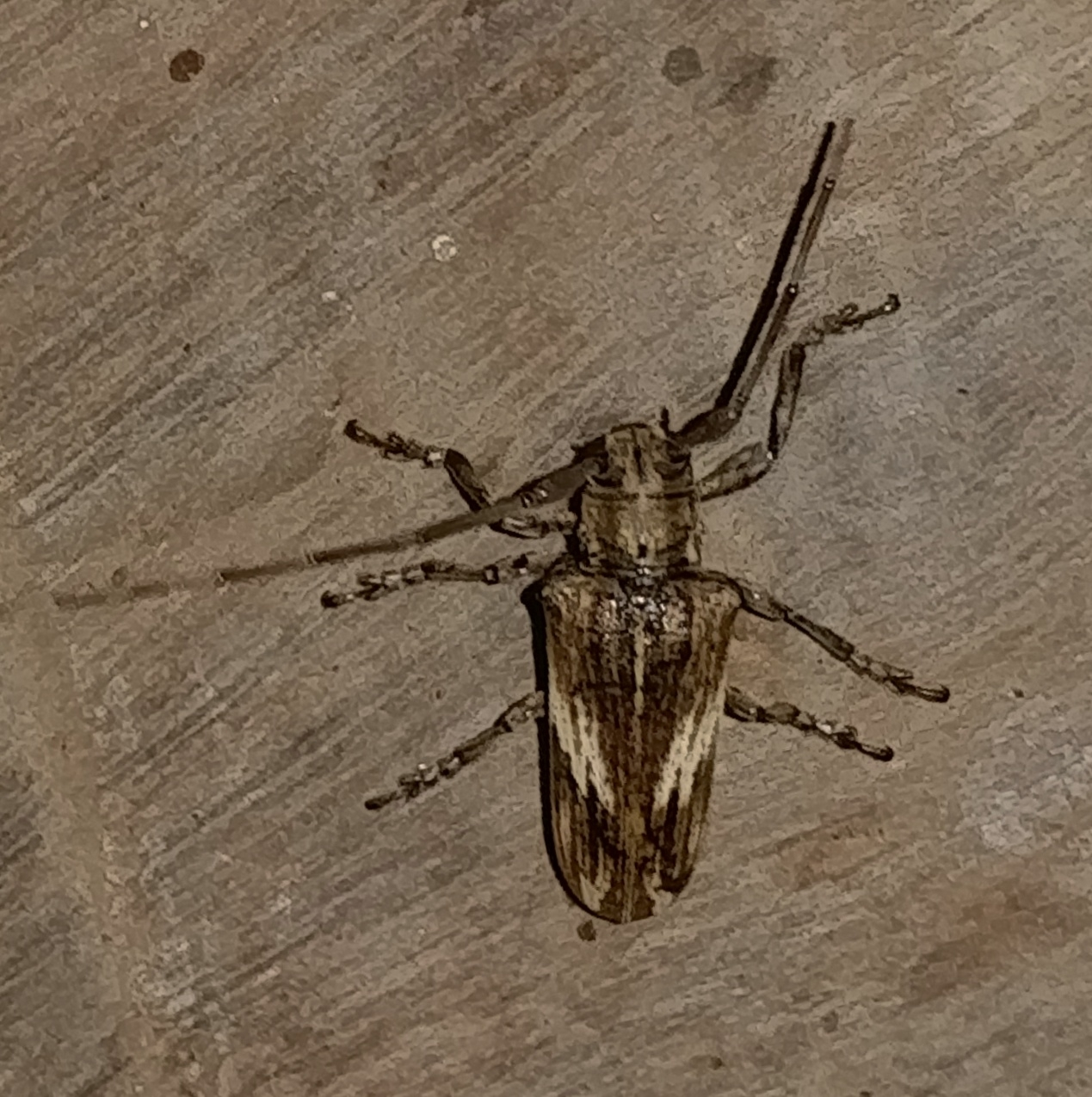

Scientific classification
- Domain: Eukaryota
- Kingdom: Animalia
- Phylum: Arthropoda
- Class: Insecta
- Order: Coleoptera
- Suborder: Polyphaga
- Infraorder: Cucujiformia
- Family: Cerambycidae
- Genus: Ischiocentra
- Species: I. monteverdensis

Binomial name
- Ischiocentra monteverdensis Giesbert, 1984

= Ischiocentra monteverdensis =

Species of beetle

Ischiocentra monteverdensis is a species of beetle in the family Cerambycidae. It was described by Giesbert in 1984. It is known from Panama and Costa Rica.
