= Lydipta pumilio =

Scientific classification
- Kingdom: Animalia
- Phylum: Arthropoda
- Clade: Pancrustacea
- Class: Insecta
- Order: Coleoptera
- Suborder: Polyphaga
- Infraorder: Cucujiformia
- Family: Cerambycidae
- Genus: Lydipta
- Species: L. pumilio

Binomial name
- Lydipta pumilio Thomson, 1868

Synonyms
- Lydipta pumilia Zikán & Zikán, 1944

Species of beetle

Lydipta pumilio is a species of beetle in the family Cerambycidae. It was described by James Thomson in 1868. It is found in Brazil (Bahia, Minas Gerais, Espírito Santo, Rio de Janeiro, São Paulo, Paraná, Santa Catarina, Rio Grande do Sul), Paraguay and Argentina.
