= Tulcus amazonicus =

Scientific classification
- Domain: Eukaryota
- Kingdom: Animalia
- Phylum: Arthropoda
- Class: Insecta
- Order: Coleoptera
- Suborder: Polyphaga
- Infraorder: Cucujiformia
- Family: Cerambycidae
- Genus: Tulcus
- Species: T. amazonicus

Binomial name
- Tulcus amazonicus (Thomson, 1860)

Synonyms
- Tulcus amazonica (Thomson) Dillon & Dillon, 1945; Hypsioma amazonica Thomson, 1860; Hypselomus amazonicus (Thomson) Bates, 1865

Species of beetle

Tulcus amazonicus is a species of beetle in the family Cerambycidae. It was described by James Thomson in 1860. It is known from Ecuador and Brazil.
