= Lydipta senicula =

Scientific classification
- Domain: Eukaryota
- Kingdom: Animalia
- Phylum: Arthropoda
- Class: Insecta
- Order: Coleoptera
- Suborder: Polyphaga
- Infraorder: Cucujiformia
- Family: Cerambycidae
- Genus: Lydipta
- Species: L. senicula

Binomial name
- Lydipta senicula (Bates, 1865)

Synonyms
- Euthima nerissa Dillon & Dillon, 1945; Hypselomus seniculus Bates, 1865; Hypsioma senicula Bates, 1865; Lampedusa seniculus Dillon & Dillon, 1945

Species of beetle

Lydipta senicula is a species of beetle in the family Cerambycidae. It was described by Henry Walter Bates in 1865. It is known from Bolivia and Brazil.
