= Hesychotypa aotinga =

Scientific classification
- Kingdom: Animalia
- Phylum: Arthropoda
- Class: Insecta
- Order: Coleoptera
- Suborder: Polyphaga
- Infraorder: Cucujiformia
- Family: Cerambycidae
- Genus: Hesychotypa
- Species: H. aotinga

Binomial name
- Hesychotypa aotinga Martins & Galileo, 2008

Species of beetle

Hesychotypa aotinga is a species of beetle in the family Cerambycidae. It was described by Martins and Galileo in 2008. It is known from Bolivia.
