= Pseudoperma =

Scientific classification
- Domain: Eukaryota
- Kingdom: Animalia
- Phylum: Arthropoda
- Class: Insecta
- Order: Coleoptera
- Suborder: Polyphaga
- Infraorder: Cucujiformia
- Family: Cerambycidae
- Tribe: Onciderini
- Subtribe: Hypsiomatina
- Genus: Pseudoperma; Dillon & Dillon, 1946

Genus of beetles

Pseudoperma is a genus of longhorn beetles of the subfamily Lamiinae, containing the following species:

- Pseudoperma chalcogramma (Bates, 1887)
- Pseudoperma patruelis (Breuning, 1940)
