= Tulcus subfasciatus =

Scientific classification
- Domain: Eukaryota
- Kingdom: Animalia
- Phylum: Arthropoda
- Class: Insecta
- Order: Coleoptera
- Suborder: Polyphaga
- Infraorder: Cucujiformia
- Family: Cerambycidae
- Genus: Tulcus
- Species: T. subfasciatus

Binomial name
- Tulcus subfasciatus (Thomson, 1860)

Synonyms
- Charoides subfasciata (Thomson, 1860)

Species of beetle

Tulcus subfasciatus is a species of beetle in the family Cerambycidae. It was described by James Thomson in 1860. It is known to be found in French Guiana.
