= Venustus zeteki =

Scientific classification
- Kingdom: Animalia
- Phylum: Arthropoda
- Class: Insecta
- Order: Coleoptera
- Suborder: Polyphaga
- Infraorder: Cucujiformia
- Family: Cerambycidae
- Genus: Venustus
- Species: V. zeteki

Binomial name
- Venustus zeteki Dillon & Dillon, 1945

Species of beetle

Venustus zeteki is a species of beetle in the family Cerambycidae. It was described by Dillon and Dillon in 1945. It is known from Panama, Colombia, Honduras and Ecuador.
