= Tulcus obliquefasciatus =

Scientific classification
- Domain: Eukaryota
- Kingdom: Animalia
- Phylum: Arthropoda
- Class: Insecta
- Order: Coleoptera
- Suborder: Polyphaga
- Infraorder: Cucujiformia
- Family: Cerambycidae
- Genus: Tulcus
- Species: T. obliquefasciatus

Binomial name
- Tulcus obliquefasciatus (Dillon & Dillon, 1952)

Synonyms
- Charoides obliquefasciata Dillon & Dillon, 1952

Species of beetle

Tulcus obliquefasciatus is a species of beetle in the family Cerambycidae. It was described by Dillon and Dillon in 1952. It is known from Brazil.
