= Hesycha biguttata =

Scientific classification
- Kingdom: Animalia
- Phylum: Arthropoda
- Class: Insecta
- Order: Coleoptera
- Suborder: Polyphaga
- Infraorder: Cucujiformia
- Family: Cerambycidae
- Genus: Hesycha
- Species: H. biguttata

Binomial name
- Hesycha biguttata Martins & Galileo, 2010

Species of beetle

Hesycha biguttata is a species of beetle in the family Cerambycidae, known from Bolivia. It was described by Martins and Galileo in 2010.
