= Pseudoperma patruelis =

Scientific classification
- Kingdom: Animalia
- Phylum: Arthropoda
- Class: Insecta
- Order: Coleoptera
- Suborder: Polyphaga
- Infraorder: Cucujiformia
- Family: Cerambycidae
- Genus: Pseudoperma
- Species: P. patruelis

Binomial name
- Pseudoperma patruelis (Breuning, 1940)

Species of beetle

Pseudoperma patruelis is a species of beetle in the family Cerambycidae. It was described by Stephan von Breuning in 1940. It is known from Brazil.
