= Tulcus fulvofasciatus =

Scientific classification
- Domain: Eukaryota
- Kingdom: Animalia
- Phylum: Arthropoda
- Class: Insecta
- Order: Coleoptera
- Suborder: Polyphaga
- Infraorder: Cucujiformia
- Family: Cerambycidae
- Genus: Tulcus
- Species: T. fulvofasciatus

Binomial name
- Tulcus fulvofasciatus (Dillon & Dillon, 1945)

Synonyms
- Charoides fulvofasciata Dillon & Dillon, 1945

Species of beetle

Tulcus fulvofasciatus is a species of beetle in the family Cerambycidae. It was described by Dillon and Dillon in 1945. It is known from Colombia and Panama.
