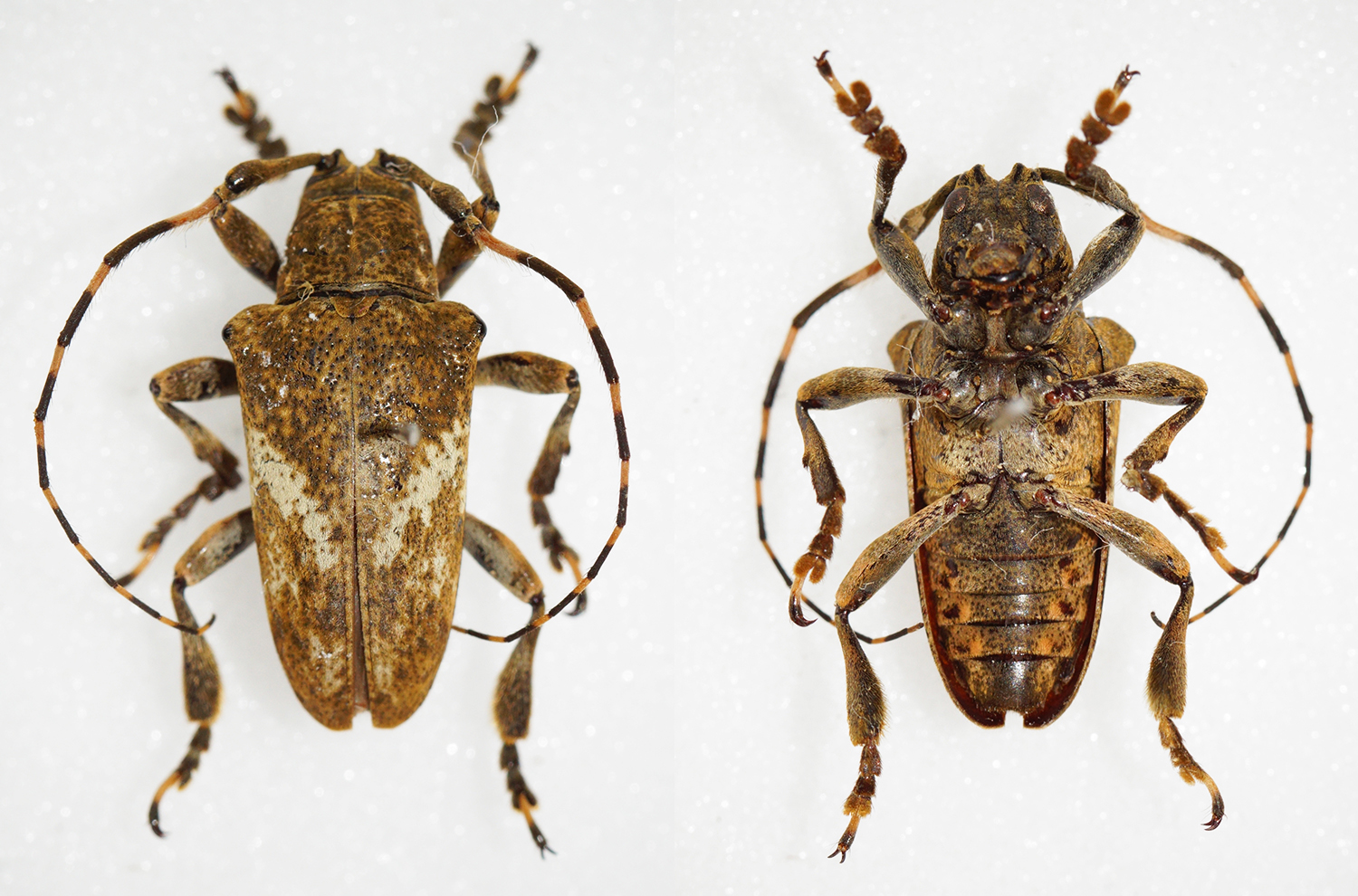

Scientific classification
- Domain: Eukaryota
- Kingdom: Animalia
- Phylum: Arthropoda
- Class: Insecta
- Order: Coleoptera
- Suborder: Polyphaga
- Infraorder: Cucujiformia
- Family: Cerambycidae
- Genus: Tulcus
- Species: T. thysbe

Binomial name
- Tulcus thysbe (Dillon & Dillon, 1945)

Synonyms
- Charoides thysbe Dillon & Dillon, 1945

= Tulcus thysbe =

Species of beetle

Tulcus thysbe is a species of beetle in the family Cerambycidae. It was described by Dillon and Dillon in 1945. It is known from Costa Rica, Ecuador and Panama.
