= Tulcus dimidiatus =

Scientific classification
- Kingdom: Animalia
- Phylum: Arthropoda
- Class: Insecta
- Order: Coleoptera
- Suborder: Polyphaga
- Infraorder: Cucujiformia
- Family: Cerambycidae
- Genus: Tulcus
- Species: T. dimidiatus

Binomial name
- Tulcus dimidiatus (Bates, 1865)

Synonyms
- Charoides dimidiata (Bates, 1865)

Species of beetle

Tulcus dimidiatus is a species of beetle in the family Cerambycidae. It was described by Henry Walter Bates in 1865. It has been found in Ecuador and Brazil.
