= Lydipta conspersa =

Scientific classification
- Domain: Eukaryota
- Kingdom: Animalia
- Phylum: Arthropoda
- Class: Insecta
- Order: Coleoptera
- Suborder: Polyphaga
- Infraorder: Cucujiformia
- Family: Cerambycidae
- Genus: Lydipta
- Species: L. conspersa

Binomial name
- Lydipta conspersa (Aurivillius, 1922)

Synonyms
- Aenea conspersa Dillon & Dillon, 1945; Lydipta pumilio Dillon & Dillon, 1952; Plerodia conspersa Aurivillius, 1922

Species of beetle

Lydipta conspersa is a species of beetle in the family Cerambycidae. It was described by Per Olof Christopher Aurivillius in 1922. It is known from Paraguay and Brazil.
