= Tulcus soma =

Scientific classification
- Domain: Eukaryota
- Kingdom: Animalia
- Phylum: Arthropoda
- Class: Insecta
- Order: Coleoptera
- Suborder: Polyphaga
- Infraorder: Cucujiformia
- Family: Cerambycidae
- Genus: Tulcus
- Species: T. soma

Binomial name
- Tulcus soma (Dillon & Dillon, 1945)

Synonyms
- Tulcus somus (Dillon & Dillon) Martins & Galileo, 2009; Charoides soma Dillon & Dillon, 1945

Species of beetle

Tulcus soma is a species of beetle in the family Cerambycidae. It was described by Dillon and Dillon in 1945. It is known from Peru.
