= Neodillonia waltersi =

Scientific classification
- Domain: Eukaryota
- Kingdom: Animalia
- Phylum: Arthropoda
- Class: Insecta
- Order: Coleoptera
- Suborder: Polyphaga
- Infraorder: Cucujiformia
- Family: Cerambycidae
- Genus: Neodillonia
- Species: N. waltersi

Binomial name
- Neodillonia waltersi Nearns & Swift, 2011

Species of beetle

Neodillonia waltersi is a species of beetle in the family Cerambycidae. It was described by Nearns and Swift in 2011.
