= Stethoperma zikani =

Scientific classification
- Kingdom: Animalia
- Phylum: Arthropoda
- Class: Insecta
- Order: Coleoptera
- Suborder: Polyphaga
- Infraorder: Cucujiformia
- Family: Cerambycidae
- Genus: Stethoperma
- Species: S. zikani

Binomial name
- Stethoperma zikani Melzer, 1923

Species of beetle

Stethoperma zikani is a species of beetle in the family Cerambycidae. It was described by Melzer in 1923. It is known from Brazil.
