= Onocephala diophthalma =

Scientific classification
- Domain: Eukaryota
- Kingdom: Animalia
- Phylum: Arthropoda
- Class: Insecta
- Order: Coleoptera
- Suborder: Polyphaga
- Infraorder: Cucujiformia
- Family: Cerambycidae
- Genus: Onocephala
- Species: O. diophthalma

Binomial name
- Onocephala diophthalma (Perty, 1830)

Species of beetle

Onocephala diophthalma is a species of beetle in the family Cerambycidae. It was described by Perty in 1830. It is known from Brazil.
