= Hesychotypa nyphonoides =

Scientific classification
- Kingdom: Animalia
- Phylum: Arthropoda
- Class: Insecta
- Order: Coleoptera
- Suborder: Polyphaga
- Infraorder: Cucujiformia
- Family: Cerambycidae
- Genus: Hesychotypa
- Species: H. nyphonoides

Binomial name
- Hesychotypa nyphonoides (Pascoe, 1859)

Species of beetle

Hesychotypa nyphonoides is a species of beetle in the family Cerambycidae. It was described by Francis Polkinghorne Pascoe in 1859. It is found in Brazil, Colombia, Ecuador and Peru.
