= Hesychotypa crocea =

Scientific classification
- Kingdom: Animalia
- Phylum: Arthropoda
- Class: Insecta
- Order: Coleoptera
- Suborder: Polyphaga
- Infraorder: Cucujiformia
- Family: Cerambycidae
- Genus: Hesychotypa
- Species: H. crocea

Binomial name
- Hesychotypa crocea Dillon & Dillon, 1945

Species of beetle

Hesychotypa crocea is a species of beetle in the family Cerambycidae. It was described by Dillon and Dillon in 1945. It is known from French Guiana.
