= Onocephala obliquata =

Scientific classification
- Domain: Eukaryota
- Kingdom: Animalia
- Phylum: Arthropoda
- Class: Insecta
- Order: Coleoptera
- Suborder: Polyphaga
- Infraorder: Cucujiformia
- Family: Cerambycidae
- Genus: Onocephala
- Species: O. obliquata

Binomial name
- Onocephala obliquata Lacordaire, 1872

Species of beetle

Onocephala obliquata is a species of beetle in the family Cerambycidae. It was described by Lacordaire in 1872. It is known from Brazil.
