= Tulcus picticorne =

Scientific classification
- Domain: Eukaryota
- Kingdom: Animalia
- Phylum: Arthropoda
- Class: Insecta
- Order: Coleoptera
- Suborder: Polyphaga
- Infraorder: Cucujiformia
- Family: Cerambycidae
- Genus: Tulcus
- Species: T. picticorne

Binomial name
- Tulcus picticorne (Bates, 1865)

Synonyms
- Hypsioma picticornis Bates, 1865; Charoides picticornis (Bates, 1865)

Species of beetle

Tulcus picticorne is a species of beetle in the family Cerambycidae. It was described by Henry Walter Bates in 1865. It is known from Peru and Brazil.
