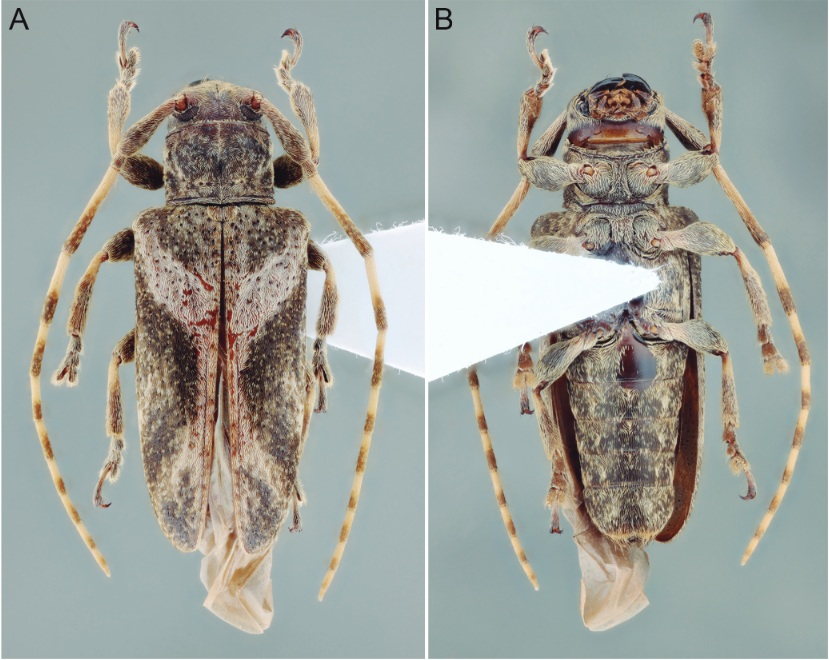

Scientific classification
- Kingdom: Animalia
- Phylum: Arthropoda
- Clade: Pancrustacea
- Class: Insecta
- Order: Coleoptera
- Suborder: Polyphaga
- Infraorder: Cucujiformia
- Family: Cerambycidae
- Genus: Hesycha
- Species: H. jataiensis

Binomial name
- Hesycha jataiensis Galileo, Martins & Santos-Silva, 2015

= Hesycha jataiensis =

Species of beetle

Hesycha jataiensis is a species of beetle of the family Cerambycidae. It is found in Brazil (São Paulo).
