= Hesychotypa avrillasi =

Scientific classification
- Kingdom: Animalia
- Phylum: Arthropoda
- Class: Insecta
- Order: Coleoptera
- Suborder: Polyphaga
- Infraorder: Cucujiformia
- Family: Cerambycidae
- Genus: Hesychotypa
- Species: H. avrillasi

Binomial name
- Hesychotypa avrillasi Audureau, 2013

Species of beetle

Hesychotypa avrillasi is a species of beetle in the family Cerambycidae. It was described by Audureau in 2013.
