= Tulcus paganus =

Scientific classification
- Domain: Eukaryota
- Kingdom: Animalia
- Phylum: Arthropoda
- Class: Insecta
- Order: Coleoptera
- Suborder: Polyphaga
- Infraorder: Cucujiformia
- Family: Cerambycidae
- Genus: Tulcus
- Species: T. paganus

Binomial name
- Tulcus paganus (Pascoe, 1859)

Synonyms
- Charoides pagana (Pascoe, 1859); Hypsioma pagana (Pascoe, 1859); Hypselomus paganus Pascoe, 1859

Species of beetle

Tulcus paganus is a species of beetle in the family Cerambycidae. It was described by Francis Polkinghorne Pascoe in 1859. It is known from Bolivia, Brazil, Colombia and Peru.
