= Stethoperma =

Scientific classification
- Domain: Eukaryota
- Kingdom: Animalia
- Phylum: Arthropoda
- Class: Insecta
- Order: Coleoptera
- Suborder: Polyphaga
- Infraorder: Cucujiformia
- Family: Cerambycidae
- Tribe: Onciderini
- Subtribe: Hypsiomatina
- Genus: Stethoperma; Lameere, 1884

Genus of beetles

Stethoperma is a genus of longhorn beetles of the subfamily Lamiinae, containing the following species:

- Stethoperma batesi Lameere, 1884
- Stethoperma candezei Lameere, 1884
- Stethoperma duodilloni Gilmour, 1950
- Stethoperma flavovittata Breuning, 1940
- Stethoperma multivittis Bates, 1887
- Stethoperma obliquepicta Breuning, 1940
- Stethoperma zikani Melzer, 1923
