= Hesychotypa punctata =

Scientific classification
- Kingdom: Animalia
- Phylum: Arthropoda
- Clade: Pancrustacea
- Class: Insecta
- Order: Coleoptera
- Suborder: Polyphaga
- Infraorder: Cucujiformia
- Family: Cerambycidae
- Genus: Hesychotypa
- Species: H. punctata

Binomial name
- Hesychotypa punctata Martins, 1979

Species of beetle

Hesychotypa punctata is a species of beetle in the family Cerambycidae. It was described by Martins in 1979. It is known from Ecuador.
