= Neolampedusa =

Scientific classification
- Kingdom: Animalia
- Phylum: Arthropoda
- Class: Insecta
- Order: Coleoptera
- Suborder: Polyphaga
- Infraorder: Cucujiformia
- Family: Cerambycidae
- Tribe: Onciderini
- Genus: Neolampedusa

Genus of beetles

Neolampedusa is a genus of longhorn beetles of the subfamily Lamiinae, containing the following species:

- Neolampedusa lateralis (Thomson, 1868)
- Neolampedusa obliquator (Fabricius, 1801)
