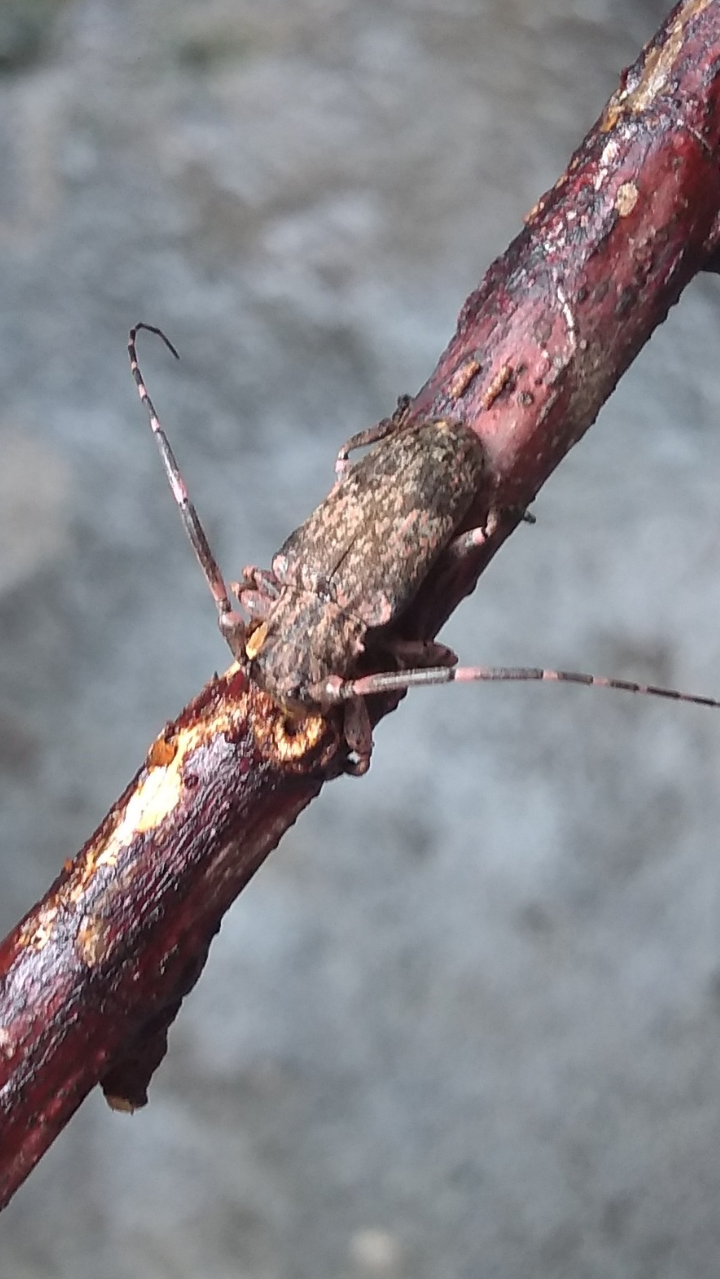

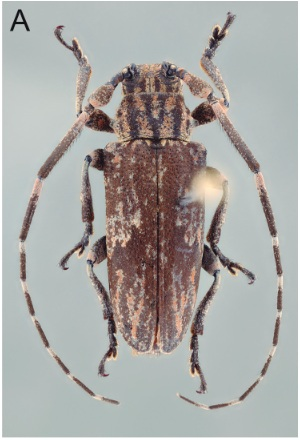

Scientific classification
- Kingdom: Animalia
- Phylum: Arthropoda
- Clade: Pancrustacea
- Class: Insecta
- Order: Coleoptera
- Suborder: Polyphaga
- Infraorder: Cucujiformia
- Family: Cerambycidae
- Genus: Hesychotypa
- Species: H. subfasciata

Binomial name
- Hesychotypa subfasciata Dillon & Dillon, 1945

= Hesychotypa subfasciata =

Species of beetle

Hesychotypa subfasciata is a species of beetle in the family Cerambycidae. It was described by Dillon and Dillon in 1945. It is found in Brazil (Maranhão, Mato Grosso, Mato Grosso do Sul, Minas Gerais, Rio de Janeiro, São Paulo, Paraná, Santa Catarina) and Paraguay.
