= Neolampedusa obliquator =

Scientific classification
- Kingdom: Animalia
- Phylum: Arthropoda
- Class: Insecta
- Order: Coleoptera
- Suborder: Polyphaga
- Infraorder: Cucujiformia
- Family: Cerambycidae
- Genus: Neolampedusa
- Species: N. obliquator

Binomial name
- Neolampedusa obliquator (Fabricius, 1801)

Synonyms
- Hypsioma obliquator (Fabricius) Thomson, 1868; Lamia obliquator Fabricius, 1801; Plerodia obliquator (Fabricius) Aurivillius, 1923

Species of beetle

Neolampedusa obliquator is a species of beetle in the family Cerambycidae. It was described by Johan Christian Fabricius in 1801. It is known from Brazil, French Guiana, and Peru.
