= Hesycha inermicollis =

Scientific classification
- Kingdom: Animalia
- Phylum: Arthropoda
- Class: Insecta
- Order: Coleoptera
- Suborder: Polyphaga
- Infraorder: Cucujiformia
- Family: Cerambycidae
- Genus: Hesycha
- Species: H. inermicollis

Binomial name
- Hesycha inermicollis (Breuning, 1940)

Species of beetle

Hesycha inermicollis is a species of beetle in the family Cerambycidae. It was described by Stephan von Breuning in 1940. It is known from Argentina and Brazil.
