= Euthima =

Scientific classification
- Domain: Eukaryota
- Kingdom: Animalia
- Phylum: Arthropoda
- Class: Insecta
- Order: Coleoptera
- Suborder: Polyphaga
- Infraorder: Cucujiformia
- Family: Cerambycidae
- Tribe: Onciderini
- Subtribe: Hypsiomatina
- Genus: Euthima; Dillon & Dillon, 1945

Genus of beetles

Euthima is a genus of flat-faced longhorns in the beetle family Cerambycidae. There are at least three described species in Euthima.

== Species ==
These four species belong to the genus Euthima:

- Euthima araujoi Martins, 1979 (Brazil)
- Euthima rodens (Bates, 1865) (Peru, Bolivia, Brazil, Ecuador, French Guiana)
- Euthima variegata (Aurivillius, 1921) (Peru, Ecuador, Bolivia)
