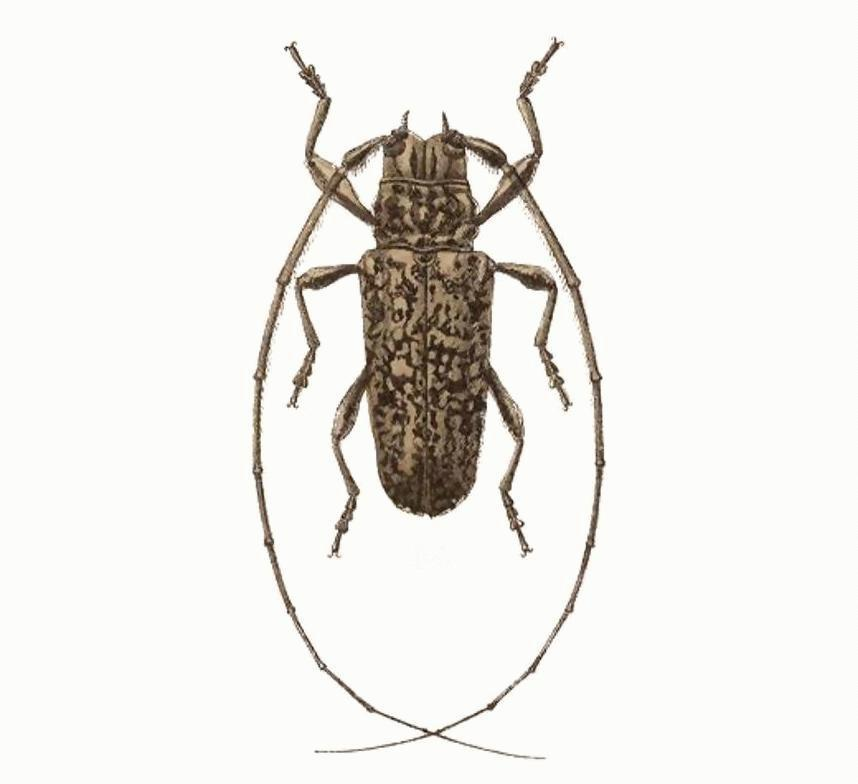

Scientific classification
- Kingdom: Animalia
- Phylum: Arthropoda
- Class: Insecta
- Order: Coleoptera
- Suborder: Polyphaga
- Infraorder: Cucujiformia
- Family: Cerambycidae
- Genus: Hesychotypa
- Species: H. turbida

Binomial name
- Hesychotypa turbida (Bates, 1880)

Synonyms
- Tybalmia turbida Bates, 1880

= Hesychotypa turbida =

Species of beetle

Hesychotypa turbida is a species of beetle in the family Cerambycidae. It was described by Henry Walter Bates in 1880. It is known from Panama, Costa Rica and Nicaragua.
