= Hesychotypa colombiana =

Scientific classification
- Kingdom: Animalia
- Phylum: Arthropoda
- Class: Insecta
- Order: Coleoptera
- Suborder: Polyphaga
- Infraorder: Cucujiformia
- Family: Cerambycidae
- Genus: Hesychotypa
- Species: H. colombiana

Binomial name
- Hesychotypa colombiana Martins & Galileo, 1990

Species of beetle

Hesychotypa colombiana is a species of beetle in the family Cerambycidae. It was described by Martins and Galileo in 1990. It is known from Ecuador and Colombia.
