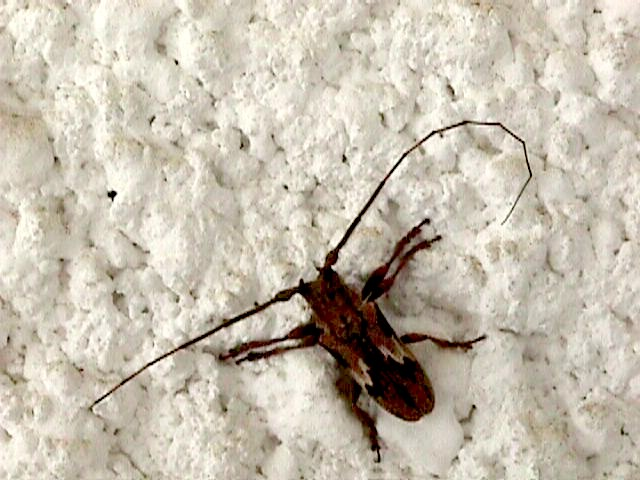
- Hesychotypa aeropa

Scientific classification
- Kingdom: Animalia
- Phylum: Arthropoda
- Class: Insecta
- Order: Coleoptera
- Suborder: Polyphaga
- Infraorder: Cucujiformia
- Family: Cerambycidae
- Subfamily: Lamiinae
- Tribe: Onciderini
- Subtribe: Onciderina
- Genus: Hesychotypa; Thomson, 1868

= Hesychotypa =

Genus of beetles

Hesychotypa is a genus of longhorn beetles of the subfamily Lamiinae, containing the following species:

- Hesychotypa ableptema Martins & Galileo, 1990
- Hesychotypa aeropa Dillon & Dillon, 1945
- Hesychotypa albofasciatus Perez-Flores & Nearns, 2021
- Hesychotypa antonkozlovi Nearns & Nascimento, 2019
- Hesychotypa aotinga Martins & Galileo, 2008
- Hesychotypa avrillasi Audureau, 2013
- Hesychotypa balia Martins & Galileo, 2009
- Hesychotypa bimaculata Dillon & Dillon, 1945
- Hesychotypa cedestes Dillon & Dillon, 1945
- Hesychotypa colombiana Martins & Galileo, 1990
- Hesychotypa crocea Dillon & Dillon, 1945
- Hesychotypa danilevskyi Nearns & Nascimento, 2019
- Hesychotypa dola Dillon & Dillon, 1945
- Hesychotypa fernandezi Martins & Galileo, 1999
- Hesychotypa heraldica (Bates, 1872)
- Hesychotypa jaspidea (Bates, 1865)
- Hesychotypa lirissa Dillon & Dillon, 1945
- Hesychotypa liturata (Bates, 1865)
- Hesychotypa maculosa (Bates, 1865)
- Hesychotypa magnifica Martins & Galileo, 2007
- Hesychotypa maraba Martins & Galileo, 2007
- Hesychotypa miniata Thomson, 1868
- Hesychotypa morvanae Audureau, 2012
- Hesychotypa nyphonoides (Pascoe, 1850)
- Hesychotypa punctata Martins, 1979
- Hesychotypa subfasciata Dillon & Dillon, 1945
- Hesychotypa turbida (Bates, 1880)
