= Hesychotypa miniata =

Scientific classification
- Kingdom: Animalia
- Phylum: Arthropoda
- Class: Insecta
- Order: Coleoptera
- Suborder: Polyphaga
- Infraorder: Cucujiformia
- Family: Cerambycidae
- Genus: Hesychotypa
- Species: H. miniata

Binomial name
- Hesychotypa miniata Thomson, 1868

Species of beetle

Hesychotypa miniata is a species of beetle in the family Cerambycidae. It was described by James Thomson in 1868. It is known from Argentina, Brazil and Paraguay.
