= Hesycha cribripennis =

Scientific classification
- Kingdom: Animalia
- Phylum: Arthropoda
- Class: Insecta
- Order: Coleoptera
- Suborder: Polyphaga
- Infraorder: Cucujiformia
- Family: Cerambycidae
- Genus: Hesycha
- Species: H. cribripennis

Binomial name
- Hesycha cribripennis Fairmaire & Germain, 1859

Species of beetle

Hesycha cribripennis is a species of beetle in the family Cerambycidae. It was described by Léon Fairmaire and Germain in 1859. It is known from Chile.
