= Hesychotypa jaspidea =

Scientific classification
- Kingdom: Animalia
- Phylum: Arthropoda
- Class: Insecta
- Order: Coleoptera
- Suborder: Polyphaga
- Infraorder: Cucujiformia
- Family: Cerambycidae
- Genus: Hesychotypa
- Species: H. jaspidea

Binomial name
- Hesychotypa jaspidea (Bates, 1865)

Species of beetle

Hesychotypa jaspidea is a species of beetle in the family Cerambycidae. It was described by Henry Walter Bates in 1865. It is known from Brazil and French Guiana.
