= Hesychotypa magnifica =

Scientific classification
- Kingdom: Animalia
- Phylum: Arthropoda
- Class: Insecta
- Order: Coleoptera
- Suborder: Polyphaga
- Infraorder: Cucujiformia
- Family: Cerambycidae
- Genus: Hesychotypa
- Species: H. magnifica

Binomial name
- Hesychotypa magnifica Martins & Galileo, 2007

Species of beetle

Hesychotypa magnifica is a species of beetle in the family Cerambycidae. It was described by Martins and Galileo in 2007. It is known from Bolivia.
