= Tulcus tigrinatus =

Scientific classification
- Domain: Eukaryota
- Kingdom: Animalia
- Phylum: Arthropoda
- Class: Insecta
- Order: Coleoptera
- Suborder: Polyphaga
- Infraorder: Cucujiformia
- Family: Cerambycidae
- Genus: Tulcus
- Species: T. tigrinatus

Binomial name
- Tulcus tigrinatus (Thomson, 1868)

Synonyms
- Charoides tigrinata (Thomson, 1868)

Species of beetle

Tulcus tigrinatus is a species of beetle in the family Cerambycidae. It was described by James Thomson in 1868. It is known from Brazil, Ecuador, French Guiana and Peru.
