= Tulcus piger =

Scientific classification
- Domain: Eukaryota
- Kingdom: Animalia
- Phylum: Arthropoda
- Class: Insecta
- Order: Coleoptera
- Suborder: Polyphaga
- Infraorder: Cucujiformia
- Family: Cerambycidae
- Genus: Tulcus
- Species: T. piger

Binomial name
- Tulcus piger (Martins & Galileo, 1990)

Synonyms
- Tulcus pigrus (Martins & Galileo) Martins & Galileo, 2009; Charoides pigra Martins & Galileo, 1990

Species of beetle

Tulcus piger is a species of beetle in the family Cerambycidae. It was described by Martins and Galileo in 1990. It is known from Bolivia.
