= Pseudoperma chalcogramma =

Scientific classification
- Domain: Eukaryota
- Kingdom: Animalia
- Phylum: Arthropoda
- Class: Insecta
- Order: Coleoptera
- Suborder: Polyphaga
- Infraorder: Cucujiformia
- Family: Cerambycidae
- Genus: Pseudoperma
- Species: P. chalcogramma

Binomial name
- Pseudoperma chalcogramma (Bates, 1887)

Species of beetle

Pseudoperma chalcogramma is a species of beetle in the family Cerambycidae. It was described by Henry Walter Bates in 1887. It is known from Brazil.
