= Tulcus signaticorne =

Scientific classification
- Domain: Eukaryota
- Kingdom: Animalia
- Phylum: Arthropoda
- Class: Insecta
- Order: Coleoptera
- Suborder: Polyphaga
- Infraorder: Cucujiformia
- Family: Cerambycidae
- Genus: Tulcus
- Species: T. signaticorne

Binomial name
- Tulcus signaticorne (Thomson, 1868)

Synonyms
- Charoides signaticornis (Thomson, 1868)

Species of beetle

Tulcus signaticorne is a species of beetle in the family Cerambycidae. It was described by James Thomson in 1868. It is known from Brazil.
