= Onocephala suturalis =

Scientific classification
- Domain: Eukaryota
- Kingdom: Animalia
- Phylum: Arthropoda
- Class: Insecta
- Order: Coleoptera
- Suborder: Polyphaga
- Infraorder: Cucujiformia
- Family: Cerambycidae
- Genus: Onocephala
- Species: O. suturalis

Binomial name
- Onocephala suturalis (Bates, 1887)

Species of beetle

Onocephala suturalis is a species of beetle in the family Cerambycidae. It was discovered by Henry Walter Bates in 1887. It is native to Brazil.
