= Tulcus pepoatus =

Scientific classification
- Domain: Eukaryota
- Kingdom: Animalia
- Phylum: Arthropoda
- Class: Insecta
- Order: Coleoptera
- Suborder: Polyphaga
- Infraorder: Cucujiformia
- Family: Cerambycidae
- Genus: Tulcus
- Species: T. pepoatus

Binomial name
- Tulcus pepoatus (Martins & Galileo, 1996)

Synonyms
- Charoides pepoata Martins & Galileo, 1996

Species of beetle

Tulcus pepoatus is a species of beetle in the family Cerambycidae. It was described by Martins and Galileo in 1996. It is known from Bolivia.
