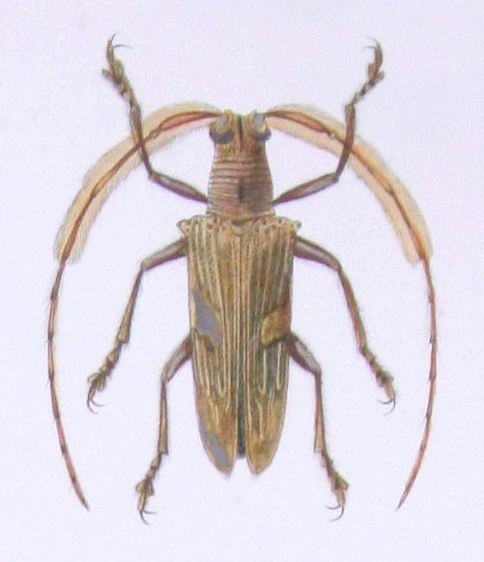

Scientific classification
- Domain: Eukaryota
- Kingdom: Animalia
- Phylum: Arthropoda
- Class: Insecta
- Order: Coleoptera
- Suborder: Polyphaga
- Infraorder: Cucujiformia
- Family: Cerambycidae
- Genus: Onocephala
- Species: O. aulica

Binomial name
- Onocephala aulica H. Lucas in Laporte, 1859

= Onocephala aulica =

Species of beetle

Onocephala aulica is a species of beetle in the family Cerambycidae. It was described by Hippolyte Lucas in 1859. It is known from Brazil.
