= Neodillonia =

Scientific classification
- Domain: Eukaryota
- Kingdom: Animalia
- Phylum: Arthropoda
- Class: Insecta
- Order: Coleoptera
- Suborder: Polyphaga
- Infraorder: Cucujiformia
- Family: Cerambycidae
- Subtribe: Hypsiomatina
- Genus: Neodillonia; Monné & Fragoso, 1984

species
- Neodillonia albisparsa (Germar, 1824); Neodillonia waltersi Nearns & Swift, 2011

Synonyms
- Clytemnestra Thomson, 1860; Dillonia Lane, 1955

Genus of beetles

Neodillonia is a genus of longhorn beetles of the subfamily Lamiinae, containing the following species:

- Neodillonia albisparsa (Germar, 1824)
- Neodillonia waltersi Nearns & Swift, 2011
