= Lydipta =

Scientific classification
- Kingdom: Animalia
- Phylum: Arthropoda
- Class: Insecta
- Order: Coleoptera
- Suborder: Polyphaga
- Infraorder: Cucujiformia
- Family: Cerambycidae
- Subtribe: Hypsiomatina
- Genus: Lydipta

Genus of beetles

Lydipta is a genus of longhorn beetles of the subfamily Lamiinae, containing the following species:

- Lydipta conspersa (Aurivillius, 1922)
- Lydipta humeralis (Martins & Galileo, 1995)
- Lydipta pumilio (Thomson, 1868)
- Lydipta senicula (Bates, 1865)
