= Ischiocentra clavata =

Scientific classification
- Domain: Eukaryota
- Kingdom: Animalia
- Phylum: Arthropoda
- Class: Insecta
- Order: Coleoptera
- Suborder: Polyphaga
- Infraorder: Cucujiformia
- Family: Cerambycidae
- Genus: Ischiocentra
- Species: I. clavata

Binomial name
- Ischiocentra clavata Thomson, 1860

Species of beetle

Ischiocentra clavata is a species of beetle in the family Cerambycidae. It was described by James Thomson in 1860. It is known from Brazil.
