= Cordites armillata =

Scientific classification
- Kingdom: Animalia
- Phylum: Arthropoda
- Class: Insecta
- Order: Coleoptera
- Suborder: Polyphaga
- Infraorder: Cucujiformia
- Family: Cerambycidae
- Genus: Cordites
- Species: C. armillata

Binomial name
- Cordites armillata (Thomson, 1868)

Species of beetle

Cordites armillata is a species of beetle in the family Cerambycidae. It was described by James Thomson in 1868. It is known from Brazil.
