= Stethoperma batesi =

Scientific classification
- Domain: Eukaryota
- Kingdom: Animalia
- Phylum: Arthropoda
- Class: Insecta
- Order: Coleoptera
- Suborder: Polyphaga
- Infraorder: Cucujiformia
- Family: Cerambycidae
- Genus: Stethoperma
- Species: S. batesi

Binomial name
- Stethoperma batesi Lameere, 1884

Species of beetle

Stethoperma batesi is a species of beetle in the family Cerambycidae. It was described by Lameere in 1884. It is known from Brazil.
