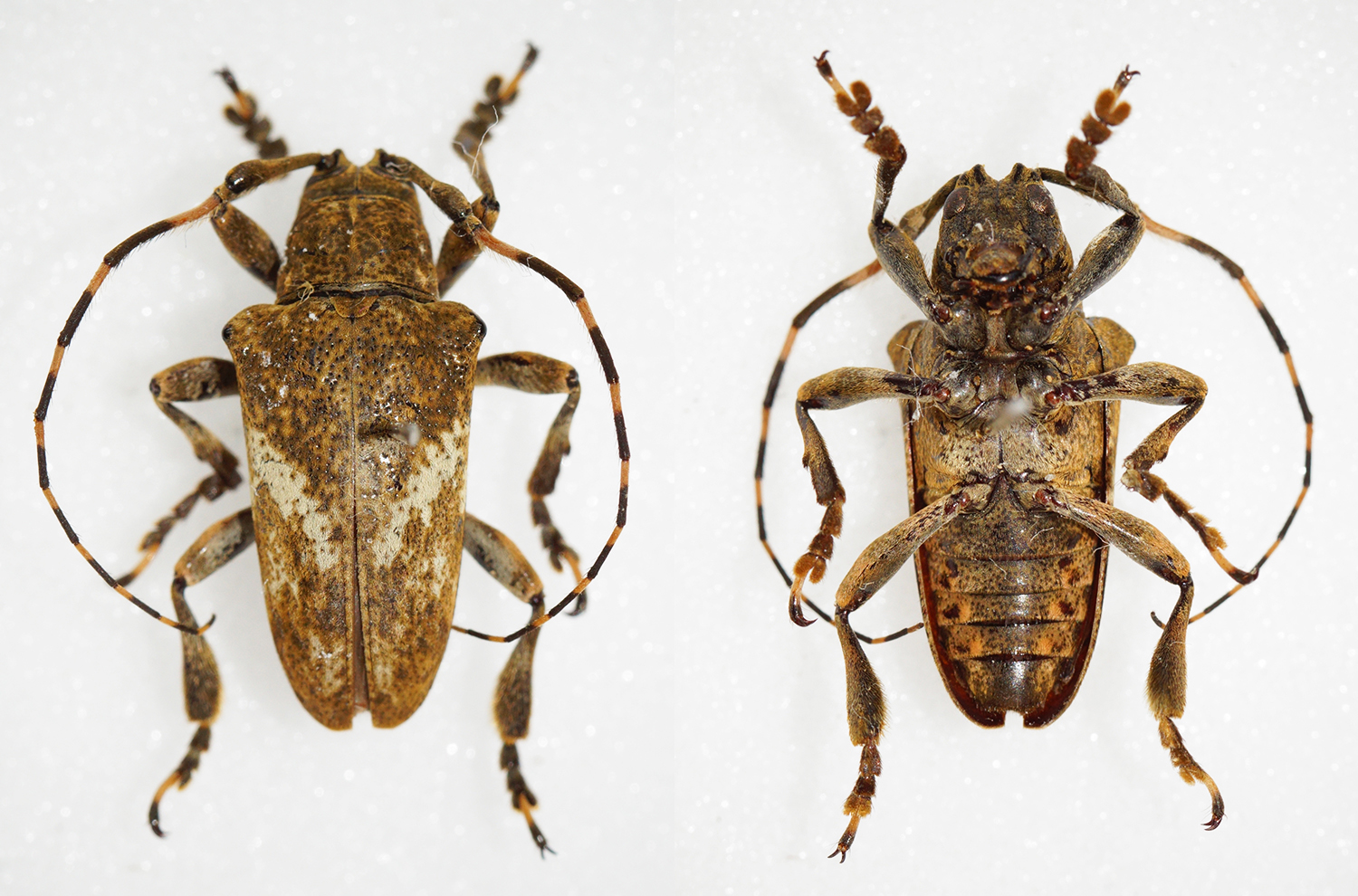
- Tulcus thysbe

Scientific classification
- Domain: Eukaryota
- Kingdom: Animalia
- Phylum: Arthropoda
- Class: Insecta
- Order: Coleoptera
- Suborder: Polyphaga
- Infraorder: Cucujiformia
- Family: Cerambycidae
- Subfamily: Lamiinae
- Tribe: Onciderini
- Genus: Tulcus; Dillon & Dillon, 1945

Species
- See text

= Tulcus =

Genus of beetles

Tulcus is a genus of longhorn beetles of the subfamily Lamiinae, containing the following species:

- Tulcus amazonicus (Thomson, 1860)
- Tulcus crudus (Erichson, 1847)
- Tulcus diaphorus Martins & Galileo, 2009
- Tulcus dimidiatus (Bates, 1865)
- Tulcus distinctus (Dillon & Dillon, 1945)
- Tulcus fulvofasciatus (Dillon & Dillon, 1945)
- Tulcus hebes (Dillon & Dillon, 1945)
- Tulcus litura (Dillon & Dillon, 1945)
- Tulcus lycimnia (Dillon & Dillon, 1945)
- Tulcus obliquefasciatus (Dillon & Dillon, 1952)
- Tulcus paganus (Pascoe, 1859)
- Tulcus pallidus (Dillon & Dillon, 1945)
- Tulcus pepoatus (Martins & Galileo, 1996)
- Tulcus picticorne (Bates, 1865)
- Tulcus piger (Martins & Galileo, 1990)
- Tulcus pullus (Dillon & Dillon, 1945)
- Tulcus signaticorne (Thomson, 1868)
- Tulcus soma (Dillon & Dillon, 1945)
- Tulcus subfasciatus (Thomson, 1860)
- Tulcus thysbe (Dillon & Dillon, 1945)
- Tulcus tigrinatus (Thomson, 1868)
