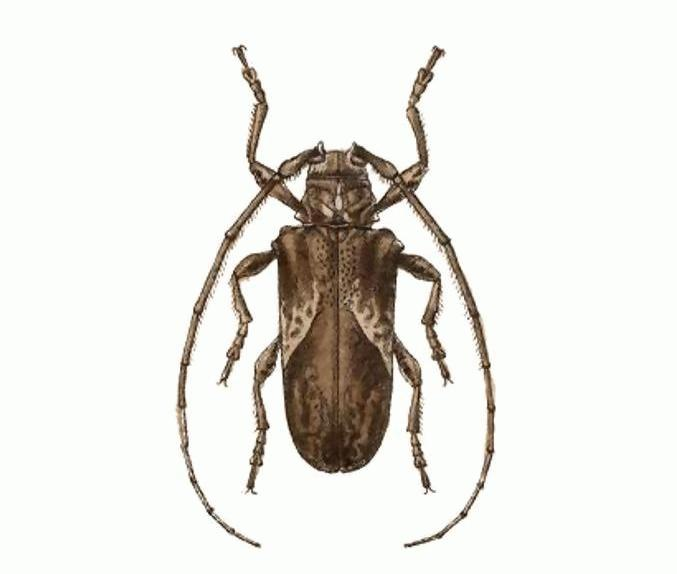

Scientific classification
- Kingdom: Animalia
- Phylum: Arthropoda
- Class: Insecta
- Order: Coleoptera
- Suborder: Polyphaga
- Infraorder: Cucujiformia
- Family: Cerambycidae
- Genus: Hesychotypa
- Species: H. heraldica

Binomial name
- Hesychotypa heraldica (Bates, 1872)

Synonyms
- Ischiocentra heraldica Bates, 1872; Tybalmia heraldica (Bates, 1872)

= Hesychotypa heraldica =

Species of beetle

Hesychotypa heraldica is a species of beetle in the family Cerambycidae. It was described by Henry Walter Bates in 1872. It is known from Guatemala, Costa Rica, Honduras, Nicaragua, Belize, and Panama.
