= Cordites =

Scientific classification
- Kingdom: Animalia
- Phylum: Arthropoda
- Class: Insecta
- Order: Coleoptera
- Suborder: Polyphaga
- Infraorder: Cucujiformia
- Family: Cerambycidae
- Tribe: Onciderini
- Genus: Cordites

Genus of beetles

Cordites is a genus of longhorn beetles of the subfamily Lamiinae, containing the following species:

- Cordites armillata (Thomson, 1868)
- Cordites pubescens (Thomson, 1868)
