= Hypselomus =

Scientific classification
- Kingdom: Animalia
- Phylum: Arthropoda
- Class: Insecta
- Order: Coleoptera
- Suborder: Polyphaga
- Infraorder: Cucujiformia
- Family: Cerambycidae
- Genus: Hypselomus
- Species: H. cristatus

Binomial name
- Hypselomus cristatus Perty, 1832

Genus of beetles

Hypselomus cristatus is a species of beetle in the family Cerambycidae, and the only species in the genus Hypselomus. It was described by Perty in 1832.
