= Neodillonia albisparsa =

Scientific classification
- Domain: Eukaryota
- Kingdom: Animalia
- Phylum: Arthropoda
- Class: Insecta
- Order: Coleoptera
- Suborder: Polyphaga
- Infraorder: Cucujiformia
- Family: Cerambycidae
- Genus: Neodillonia
- Species: N. albisparsa

Binomial name
- Neodillonia albisparsa (Germar, 1824)

Synonyms
- Clytemnestra adspersa Laporte, 1840

Species of beetle

Neodillonia albisparsa is a species of beetle in the family Cerambycidae. It was described by Ernst Friedrich Germar in 1824. It is known from Argentina, Brazil, Paraguay and Uruguay.
