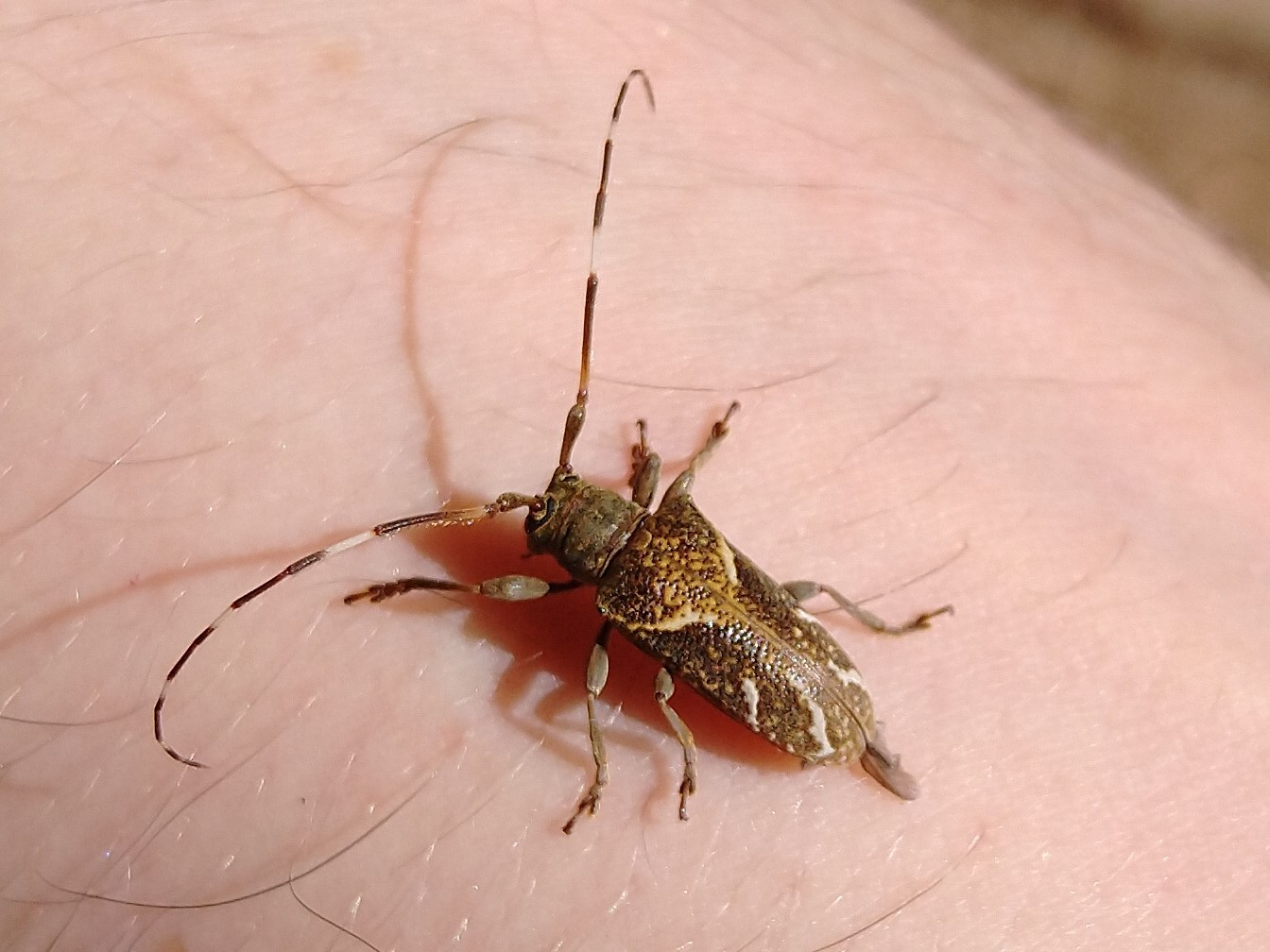

Scientific classification
- Domain: Eukaryota
- Kingdom: Animalia
- Phylum: Arthropoda
- Class: Insecta
- Order: Coleoptera
- Suborder: Polyphaga
- Infraorder: Cucujiformia
- Family: Cerambycidae
- Genus: Apamauta; Thomson, 1867
- Species: A. lineolata

Binomial name
- Apamauta lineolata Thomson, 1868

Synonyms
- (Genus): Apamanta Lacordaire, 1872; (Species): Apamanta lineolata Lacordaire, 1872

= Apamauta =

Apamauta lineolata

Genus of beetles

Apamauta is a genus species of beetles in the family Cerambycidae. It is monotypic, being represented by the single species Apamauta lineolata.
