= Sulpitus =

Scientific classification
- Kingdom: Animalia
- Phylum: Arthropoda
- Class: Insecta
- Order: Coleoptera
- Suborder: Polyphaga
- Infraorder: Cucujiformia
- Family: Cerambycidae
- Genus: Sulpitus
- Species: S. lilla

Binomial name
- Sulpitus lilla Dillon & Dillon, 1945

Genus of beetles

Sulpitus lilla is a species of beetle in the family Cerambycidae, and the only species in the genus Sulpitus. It was described by Dillon and Dillon in 1945.
