= Venustus =

Scientific classification
- Kingdom: Animalia
- Phylum: Arthropoda
- Class: Insecta
- Order: Coleoptera
- Suborder: Polyphaga
- Infraorder: Cucujiformia
- Family: Cerambycidae
- Tribe: Onciderini
- Genus: Venustus

Genus of beetles

Venustus is a genus of longhorn beetles of the subfamily Lamiinae, containing the following species:

- Venustus analogus Martins & Galileo, 1996
- Venustus zeteki Dillon & Dillon, 1945
