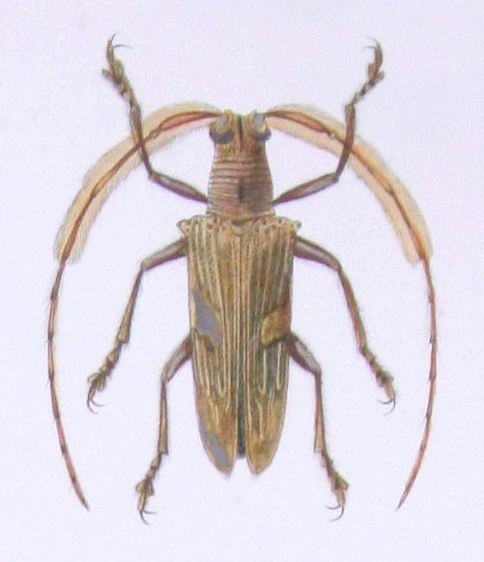
- Onocephala aulica

Scientific classification
- Domain: Eukaryota
- Kingdom: Animalia
- Phylum: Arthropoda
- Class: Insecta
- Order: Coleoptera
- Suborder: Polyphaga
- Infraorder: Cucujiformia
- Family: Cerambycidae
- Tribe: Onciderini
- Genus: Onocephala; Sturm, 1843

= Onocephala =

Genus of beetles

Onocephala is a genus of longhorn beetles of the subfamily Lamiinae, containing the following species:

- Onocephala aulica Lucas in Laporte, 1859
- Onocephala diophthalma (Perty, 1830)
- Onocephala lacordairei Dillon & Dillon, 1946
- Onocephala lineola Dillon & Dillon, 1946
- Onocephala obliquata Lacordaire, 1872
- Onocephala rugicollis Thomson, 1857
- Onocephala suturalis (Bates, 1887)
- Onocephala tepahi Dillon & Dillon, 1946
- Onocephala thomsoni Dillon & Dillon, 1946
- Onocephala vittipennis (Breuning, 1940)
