= Hesycha =

Scientific classification
- Kingdom: Animalia
- Phylum: Arthropoda
- Clade: Pancrustacea
- Class: Insecta
- Order: Coleoptera
- Suborder: Polyphaga
- Infraorder: Cucujiformia
- Family: Cerambycidae
- Subfamily: Lamiinae
- Tribe: Onciderini
- Genus: Hesycha; Fairmaire & Germain, 1859

Genus of beetles

Hesycha is a genus of longhorn beetles of the subfamily Lamiinae, containing the following species:

- Hesycha biguttata Martins & Galileo, 2010
- Hesycha bimaculata Martins & Galileo, 1990
- Hesycha clavata Martins & Galileo, 1990
- Hesycha consimilis Thomson, 1868
- Hesycha cribripennis Fairmaire & Germain, 1859
- Hesycha crucifera Dillon & Dillon, 1952
- Hesycha fasciata Martins & Galileo, 1990
- Hesycha inermicollis (Breuning, 1940)
- Hesycha jataiensis Galileo, Martins & Santos-Silva, 2015
- Hesycha microphthalma Martins & Galileo, 1990
- Hesycha simplex Martins & Galileo, 1990
- Hesycha strandi (Breuning, 1943)
- Hesycha variabilis Dillon & Dillon, 1945
