= Lagocheirus xileuco =

Scientific classification
- Domain: Eukaryota
- Kingdom: Animalia
- Phylum: Arthropoda
- Class: Insecta
- Order: Coleoptera
- Suborder: Polyphaga
- Infraorder: Cucujiformia
- Family: Cerambycidae
- Genus: Lagocheirus
- Species: L. xileuco

Binomial name
- Lagocheirus xileuco Toledo, 1998

Species of beetle

Lagocheirus xileuco is a species of beetle in the family Cerambycidae.
