= Lagocheirus unicolor =

Scientific classification
- Domain: Eukaryota
- Kingdom: Animalia
- Phylum: Arthropoda
- Class: Insecta
- Order: Coleoptera
- Suborder: Polyphaga
- Infraorder: Cucujiformia
- Family: Cerambycidae
- Genus: Lagocheirus
- Species: L. unicolor

Binomial name
- Lagocheirus unicolor Fisher, 1947

Species of beetle

Lagocheirus unicolor is a species of beetle in the family Cerambycidae.
