= Lagocheirus rogersi =

Scientific classification
- Domain: Eukaryota
- Kingdom: Animalia
- Phylum: Arthropoda
- Class: Insecta
- Order: Coleoptera
- Suborder: Polyphaga
- Infraorder: Cucujiformia
- Family: Cerambycidae
- Genus: Lagocheirus
- Species: L. rogersi

Binomial name
- Lagocheirus rogersi Bates, 1880

Species of beetle

Lagocheirus rogersi is a species of beetle in the family Cerambycidae. There are two known subspecies of this insect: Lagocheirus rogersi panamensis and Lagocheirus rogersi hondurensis.
