= Lagocheirus integer =

Scientific classification
- Domain: Eukaryota
- Kingdom: Animalia
- Phylum: Arthropoda
- Class: Insecta
- Order: Coleoptera
- Suborder: Polyphaga
- Infraorder: Cucujiformia
- Family: Cerambycidae
- Genus: Lagocheirus
- Species: L. integer

Binomial name
- Lagocheirus integer Bates, 1885

Species of beetle

Lagocheirus integer is a species of longhorn beetles of the subfamily Lamiinae. It was described by Bates in 1885, and is known from eastern Mexico to Panama.
