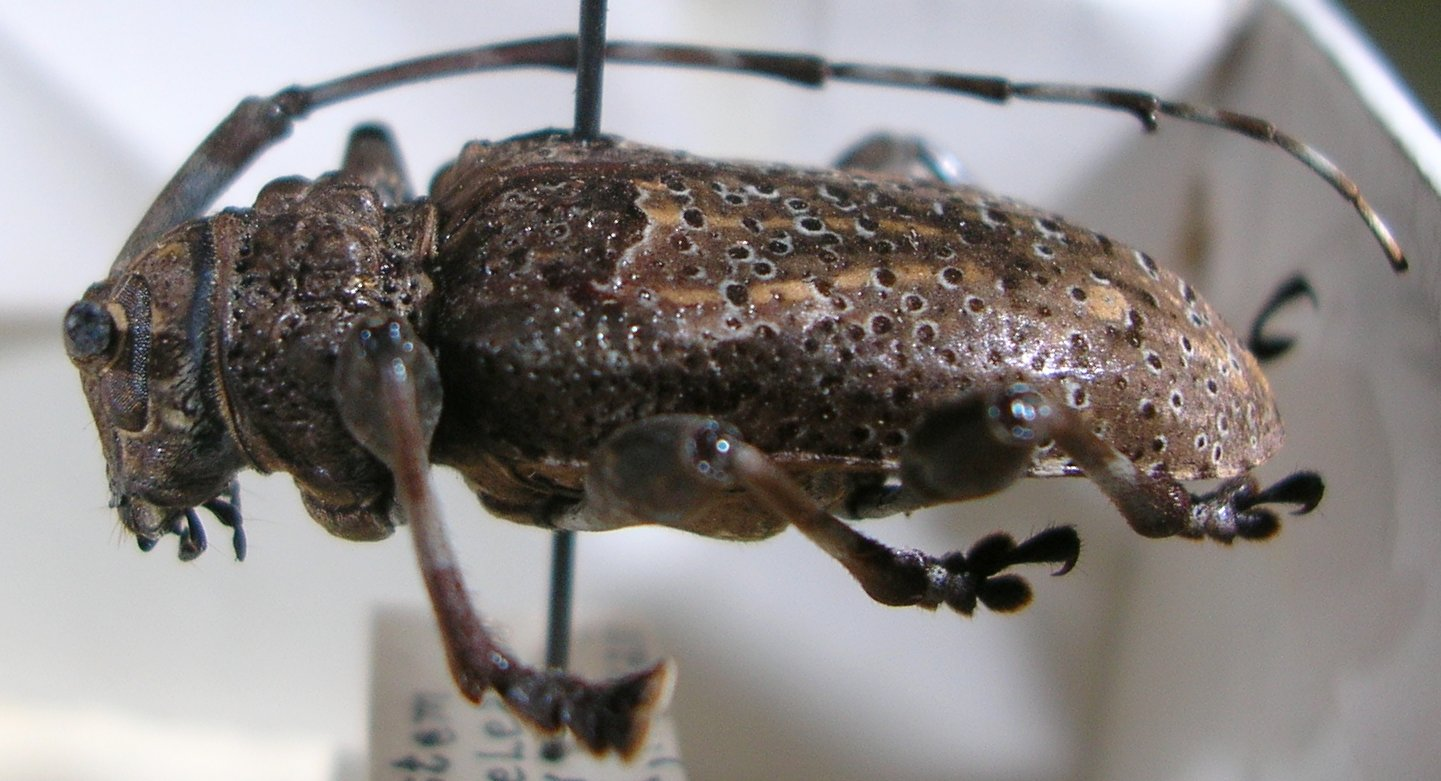
- Lagocheirus funestus

Scientific classification
- Kingdom: Animalia
- Phylum: Arthropoda
- Class: Insecta
- Order: Coleoptera
- Suborder: Polyphaga
- Infraorder: Cucujiformia
- Family: Cerambycidae
- Subfamily: Lamiinae
- Tribe: Acanthocinini
- Genus: Lagocheirus; Dejean, 1835

= Lagocheirus =

Genus of beetles

Lagocheirus is a genus of longhorn beetles of the subfamily Lamiinae. It was described by Dejean in 1835.

== Species ==
- Lagocheirus araneiformis (Linnaeus, 1767)
- Lagocheirus binumeratus Thomson, 1860
- Lagocheirus cristulatus Bates, 1872
- Lagocheirus delestali Toledo & Esteban, 2008
- Lagocheirus foveolatus Dillon, 1957
- Lagocheirus funestus (Thomson, 1865)
- Lagocheirus giesberti Hovore, 1998
- Lagocheirus integer Bates, 1885
- Lagocheirus jamaicensis Toledo & Hovore, 2005
- Lagocheirus kathleenae Hovore, 1998
- Lagocheirus lugubris Dillon, 1957
- Lagocheirus mecotrochanter Toledo, 1998
- Lagocheirus obsoletus Thomson, 1860
- Lagocheirus plantaris Erichson, 1847
- Lagocheirus praecellens Bates, 1872
- Lagocheirus procerus Casey, 1913
- Lagocheirus rogersi Bates, 1880
- Lagocheirus rosaceus Bates, 1869
- Lagocheirus simplicicornis Bates, 1872
- Lagocheirus unicolor Fisher, 1947
- Lagocheirus wenzeli Dillon, 1957
- Lagocheirus xileuco Toledo, 1998
