= Jamesia ramirezi =

Scientific classification
- Kingdom: Animalia
- Phylum: Arthropoda
- Class: Insecta
- Order: Coleoptera
- Suborder: Polyphaga
- Infraorder: Cucujiformia
- Family: Cerambycidae
- Genus: Jamesia
- Species: J. ramirezi

Binomial name
- Jamesia ramirezi Nearns & Tavakilian, 2012

Species of beetle

Jamesia ramirezi is a species of beetle in the family Cerambycidae. It was described by Nearns and Tavakilian in 2012. It is known from Costa Rica.
