= Jamesia lineata =

Scientific classification
- Kingdom: Animalia
- Phylum: Arthropoda
- Class: Insecta
- Order: Coleoptera
- Suborder: Polyphaga
- Infraorder: Cucujiformia
- Family: Cerambycidae
- Genus: Jamesia
- Species: J. lineata

Binomial name
- Jamesia lineata Fisher, 1926

Synonyms
- Paraclytemnestra gigantea Breuning, 1974; Paraclytemnestra lineata (Fisher) Breuning, 1974

Species of beetle

Jamesia lineata is a species of beetle in the family Cerambycidae. It was described by Fisher in 1926. It is known from Saint Lucia.
