= Lagocheirus foveolatus =

Scientific classification
- Domain: Eukaryota
- Kingdom: Animalia
- Phylum: Arthropoda
- Class: Insecta
- Order: Coleoptera
- Suborder: Polyphaga
- Infraorder: Cucujiformia
- Family: Cerambycidae
- Genus: Lagocheirus
- Species: L. foveolatus

Binomial name
- Lagocheirus foveolatus Dillon, 1957

Species of beetle

Lagocheirus foveolatus is a species of longhorn beetles of the subfamily Lamiinae. It was described by Dillon in 1957, and is known from Panama.
