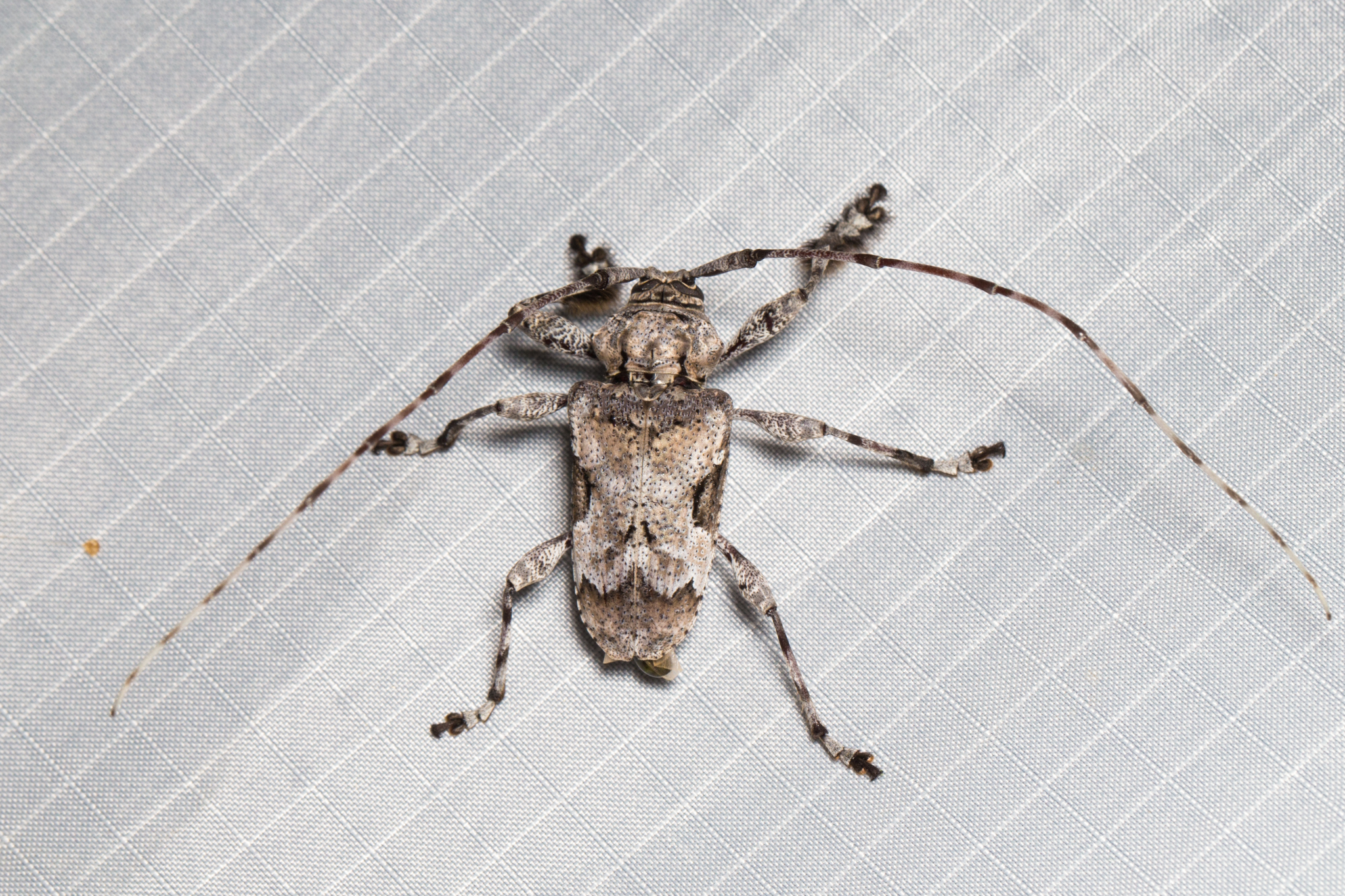

Scientific classification
- Kingdom: Animalia
- Phylum: Arthropoda
- Clade: Pancrustacea
- Class: Insecta
- Order: Coleoptera
- Suborder: Polyphaga
- Infraorder: Cucujiformia
- Family: Cerambycidae
- Genus: Lagocheirus
- Species: L. procerus

Binomial name
- Lagocheirus procerus Casey, 1913

= Lagocheirus procerus =

Species of beetle

Lagocheirus procerus is a species of longhorn beetles of the subfamily Lamiinae. It was described by Casey in 1913, and is known from Baja California, Mexico.
