= Lagocheirus giesberti =

Scientific classification
- Kingdom: Animalia
- Phylum: Arthropoda
- Class: Insecta
- Order: Coleoptera
- Suborder: Polyphaga
- Infraorder: Cucujiformia
- Family: Cerambycidae
- Genus: Lagocheirus
- Species: L. giesberti

Binomial name
- Lagocheirus giesberti Hovore, 1998

Species of beetle

Lagocheirus giesberti is a species of longhorn beetles of the subfamily Lamiinae. It was described by Hovore in 1998, and is known from Costa Rica.
