= Jamesia bella =

Scientific classification
- Kingdom: Animalia
- Phylum: Arthropoda
- Class: Insecta
- Order: Coleoptera
- Suborder: Polyphaga
- Infraorder: Cucujiformia
- Family: Cerambycidae
- Genus: Jamesia
- Species: J. bella

Binomial name
- Jamesia bella Galileo & Martins, 2003

Species of beetle

Jamesia bella is a species of beetle in the family Cerambycidae. It was described by Galileo and Martins in 2003, and is known from Colombia, where the holotype specimen was collected on Isla Gorgona.
