= Lagocheirus cristulatus =

Scientific classification
- Domain: Eukaryota
- Kingdom: Animalia
- Phylum: Arthropoda
- Class: Insecta
- Order: Coleoptera
- Suborder: Polyphaga
- Infraorder: Cucujiformia
- Family: Cerambycidae
- Genus: Lagocheirus
- Species: L. cristulatus

Binomial name
- Lagocheirus cristulatus Bates, 1872

Species of beetle

Lagocheirus cristulatus is a species of longhorn beetles of the subfamily Lamiinae. It was described by Bates in 1872, and is known from southern central Mexico to Costa Rica.
