= Lagocheirus jamaicensis =

Scientific classification
- Domain: Eukaryota
- Kingdom: Animalia
- Phylum: Arthropoda
- Class: Insecta
- Order: Coleoptera
- Suborder: Polyphaga
- Infraorder: Cucujiformia
- Family: Cerambycidae
- Genus: Lagocheirus
- Species: L. jamaicensis

Binomial name
- Lagocheirus jamaicensis Toledo & Hovore, 2005

Species of beetle

Lagocheirus jamaicensis is a species of longhorn beetles of the subfamily Lamiinae. It was described by Toledo and Hovore in 2005, and is known from Jamaica, from which its species epithet is derived.
