= Lagocheirus lugubris =

Scientific classification
- Domain: Eukaryota
- Kingdom: Animalia
- Phylum: Arthropoda
- Class: Insecta
- Order: Coleoptera
- Suborder: Polyphaga
- Infraorder: Cucujiformia
- Family: Cerambycidae
- Genus: Lagocheirus
- Species: L. lugubris

Binomial name
- Lagocheirus lugubris Dillon, 1957

Species of beetle

Lagocheirus lugubris is a species of longhorn beetles of the subfamily Lamiinae. It was described by Dillon in 1957, and is known from south-central Mexico.
