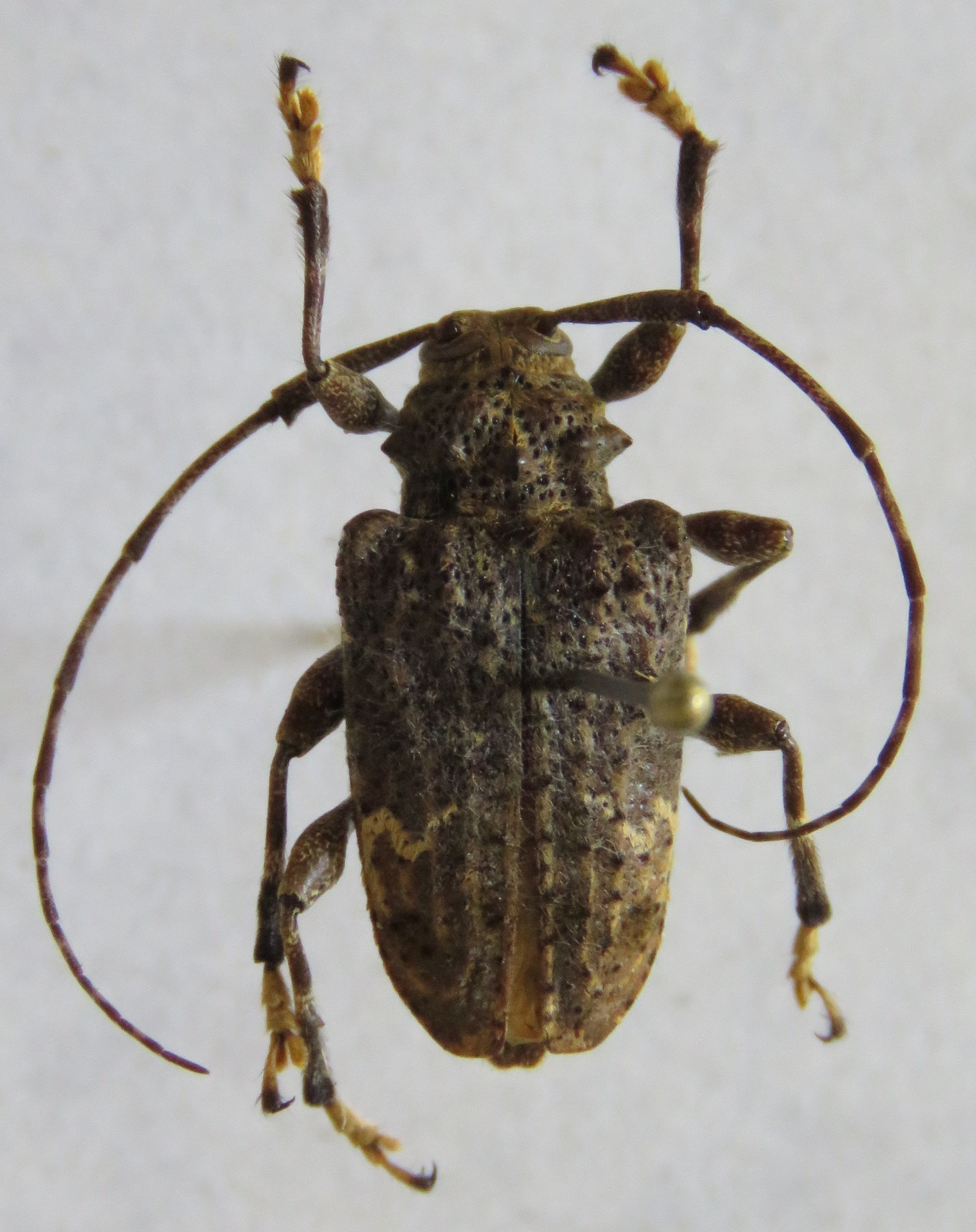

Scientific classification
- Domain: Eukaryota
- Kingdom: Animalia
- Phylum: Arthropoda
- Class: Insecta
- Order: Coleoptera
- Suborder: Polyphaga
- Infraorder: Cucujiformia
- Family: Cerambycidae
- Genus: Lagocheirus
- Species: L. binumeratus

Binomial name
- Lagocheirus binumeratus Thomson, 1860

= Lagocheirus binumeratus =

Species of beetle

Lagocheirus binumeratus is a species of longhorn beetles of the subfamily Lamiinae. It was described by Thomson in 1860, and is known from eastern central Mexico to Panama.
