= Lagocheirus delestali =

Scientific classification
- Domain: Eukaryota
- Kingdom: Animalia
- Phylum: Arthropoda
- Class: Insecta
- Order: Coleoptera
- Suborder: Polyphaga
- Infraorder: Cucujiformia
- Family: Cerambycidae
- Genus: Lagocheirus
- Species: L. delestali

Binomial name
- Lagocheirus delestali Toledo & Esteban, 2008

Species of beetle

Lagocheirus delestali is a species of longhorn beetles of the subfamily Lamiinae. It was described by Toledo and Esteban in 2008, and is known from Costa Rica.
