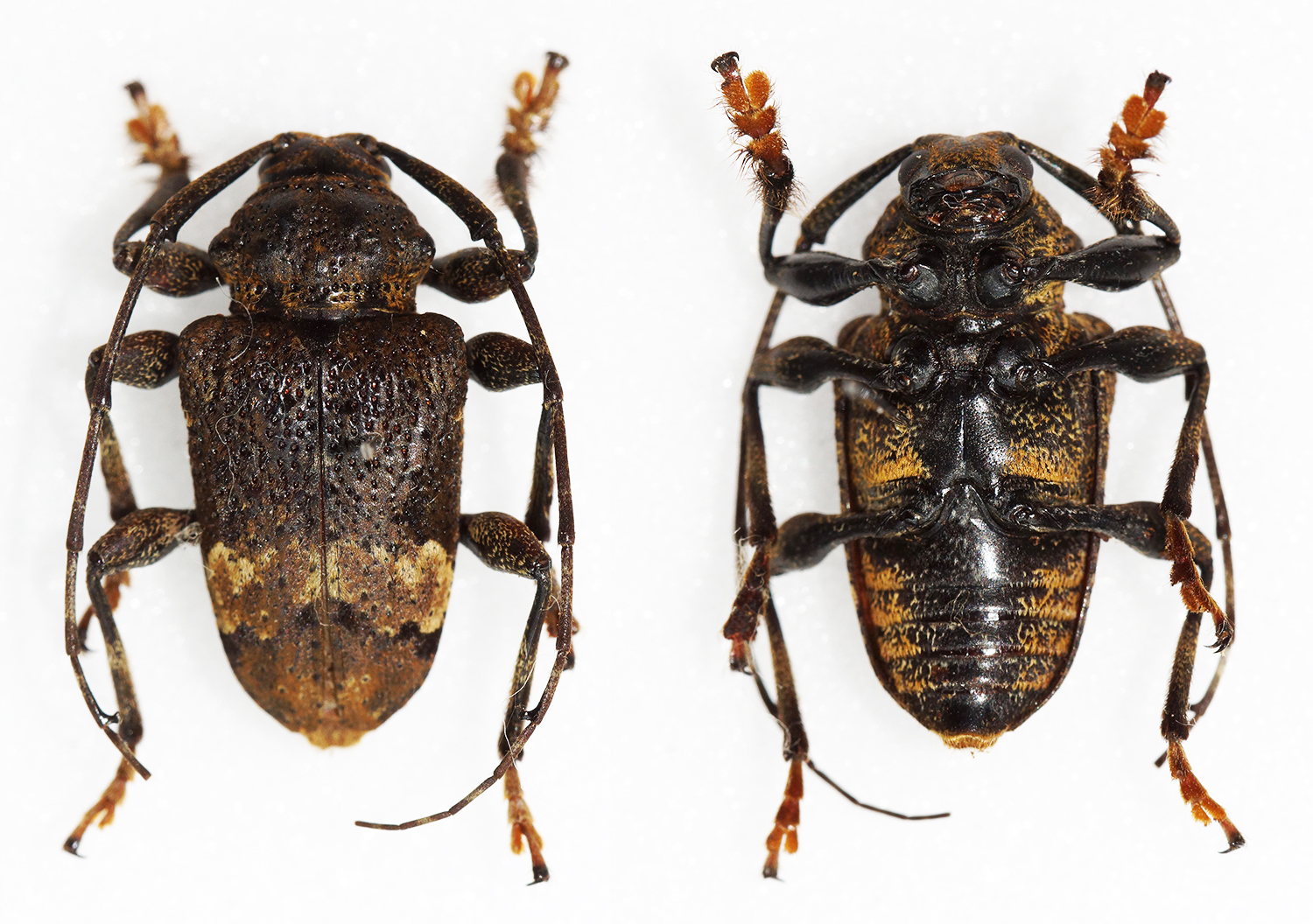

Scientific classification
- Kingdom: Animalia
- Phylum: Arthropoda
- Class: Insecta
- Order: Coleoptera
- Suborder: Polyphaga
- Infraorder: Cucujiformia
- Family: Cerambycidae
- Genus: Lagocheirus
- Species: L. plantaris

Binomial name
- Lagocheirus plantaris Erichson, 1847

= Lagocheirus plantaris =

Species of beetle

Lagocheirus plantaris is a species of longhorn beetle of the subfamily Lamiinae. It was described by Wilhelm Ferdinand Erichson in 1847, and is known from northern South America, eastern Ecuador, Bolivia, Colombia, Costa Rica, and Panama.

== Subspecies ==
- Lagocheirus plantaris plantaris Erichson, 1847
- Lagocheirus plantaris gorgonae Dillon, 1957 - Named for Gorgona, Colombia, from which it was described.
- Lagocheirus plantaris indistinctus Dillon, 1957
