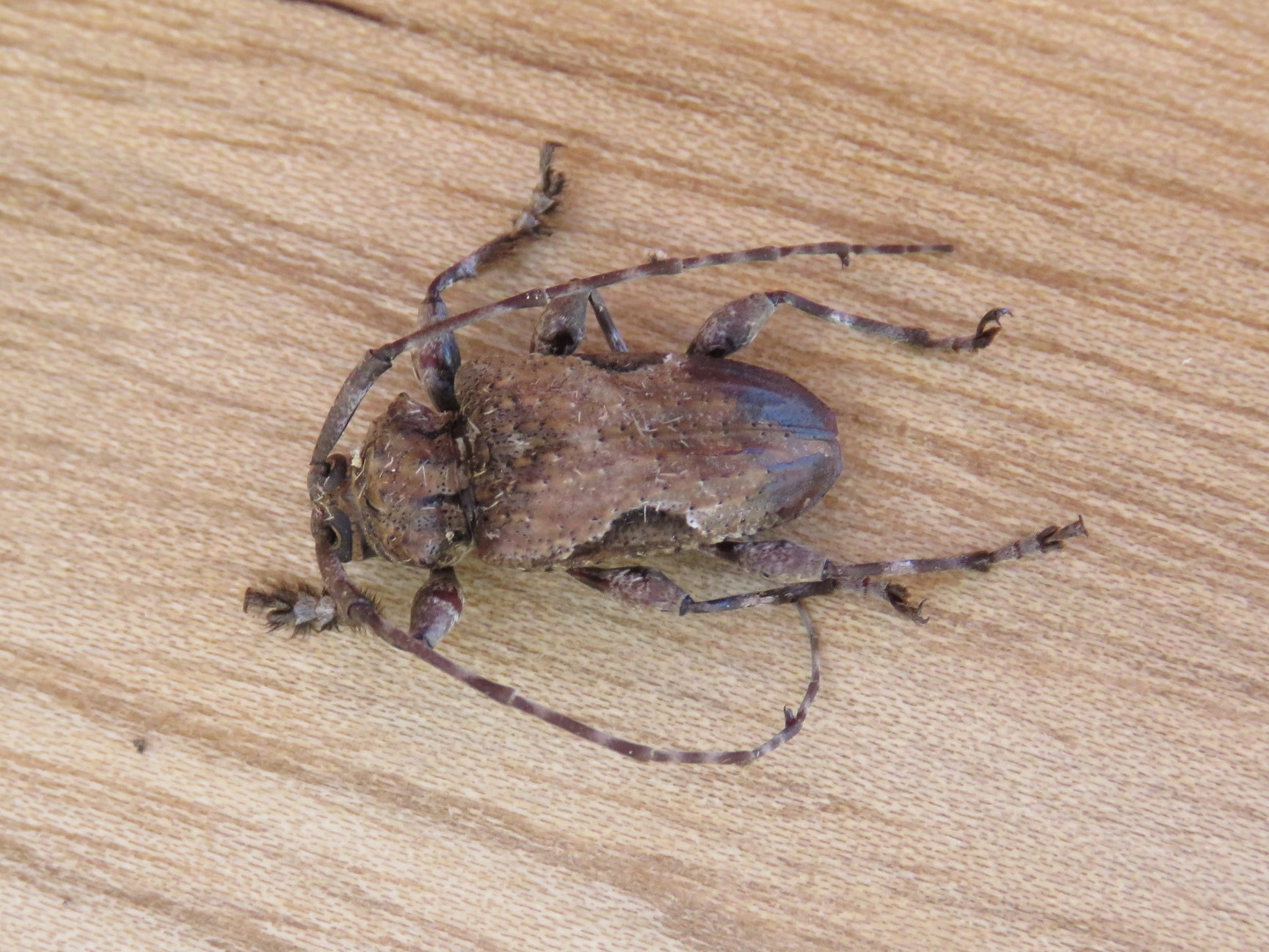

Scientific classification
- Domain: Eukaryota
- Kingdom: Animalia
- Phylum: Arthropoda
- Class: Insecta
- Order: Coleoptera
- Suborder: Polyphaga
- Infraorder: Cucujiformia
- Family: Cerambycidae
- Genus: Lagocheirus
- Species: L. obsoletus

Binomial name
- Lagocheirus obsoletus Thomson, 1860

Synonyms
- Cerambyx undatus Voet, 1781 (Unav.); Lagocheirus longipennis Bates 1880; Lagocheirus zimmermani Dillon, 1952; Lagocheirus texensis Dillon, 1956; Lagocheirus undatus mariorum Dillon 1957; Lagocheirus zimmermani aukena Dillon, 1957

= Lagocheirus obsoletus =

Species of beetle

Lagocheirus obsoletus is a species of longhorn beetles of the subfamily Lamiinae. It has been found in the south-western United States, Mexico, Costa Rica, Cuba and Jamaica.
