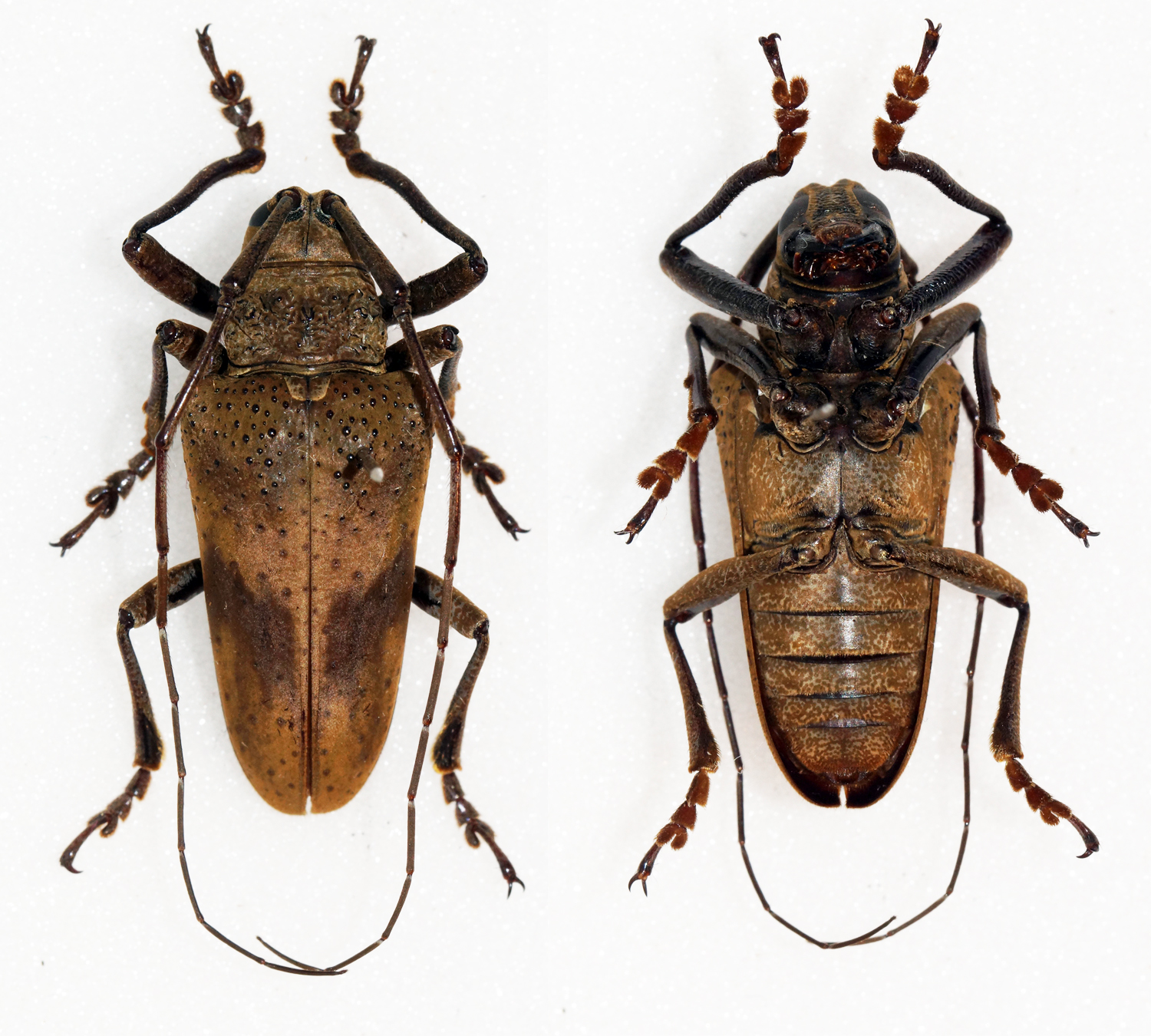

Scientific classification
- Kingdom: Animalia
- Phylum: Arthropoda
- Class: Insecta
- Order: Coleoptera
- Suborder: Polyphaga
- Infraorder: Cucujiformia
- Family: Cerambycidae
- Genus: Jamesia
- Species: J. papulenta

Binomial name
- Jamesia papulenta Thomson, 1868

= Jamesia papulenta =

Species of beetle

Jamesia papulenta is a species of beetle in the family Cerambycidae. It was described by James Thomson in 1868. It is known from Ecuador, Costa Rica, Colombia, Panama, Nicaragua, and Peru.
