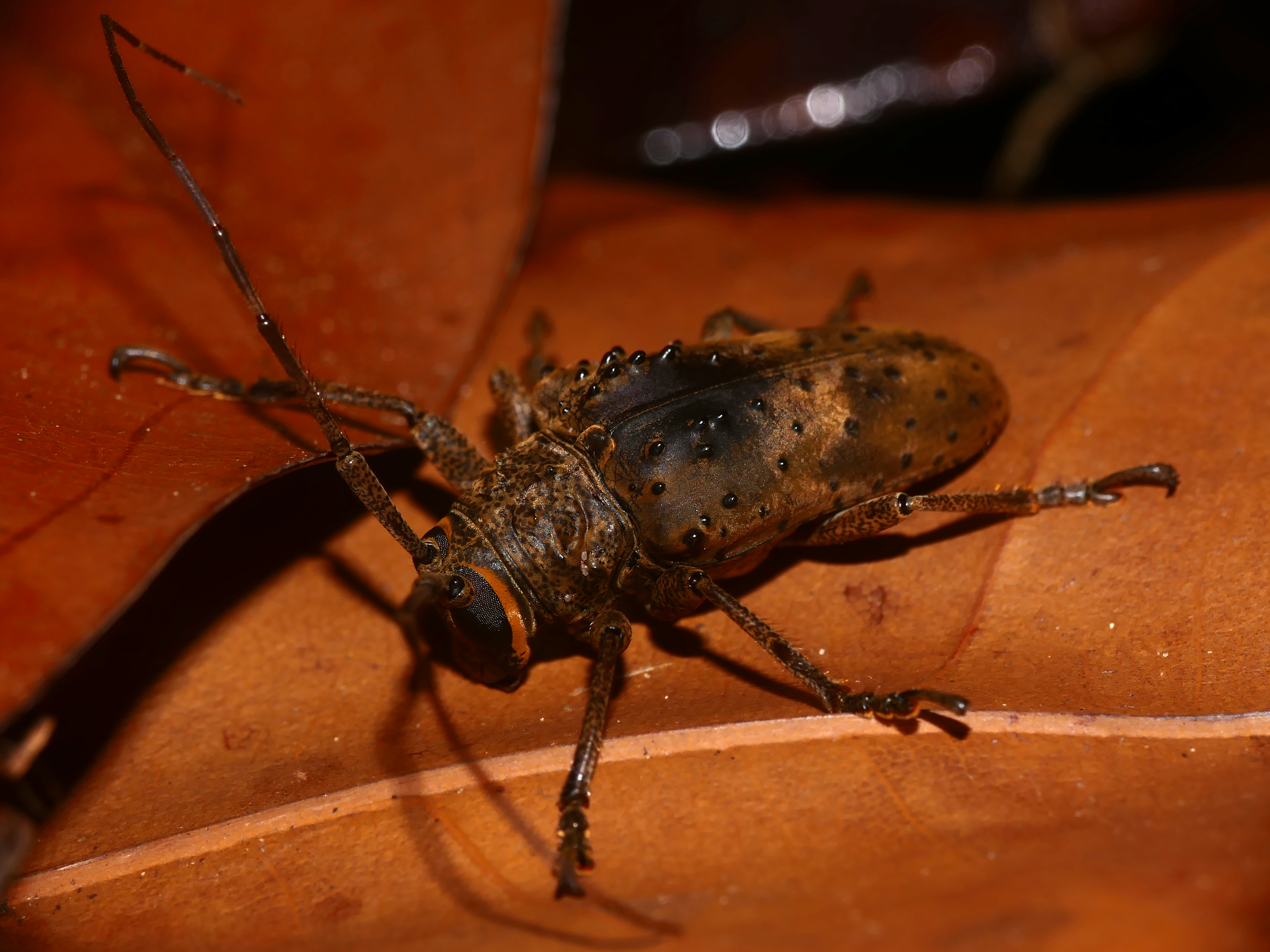
- Jamesia globifera

Scientific classification
- Kingdom: Animalia
- Phylum: Arthropoda
- Class: Insecta
- Order: Coleoptera
- Suborder: Polyphaga
- Infraorder: Cucujiformia
- Family: Cerambycidae
- Tribe: Onciderini
- Genus: Jamesia

= Jamesia (beetle) =

Genus of beetles

Jamesia is a genus of longhorn beetles of the subfamily Lamiinae, containing the following species:

- Jamesia bella Galileo & Martins, 2003
- Jamesia duofasciata Dillon & Dillon, 1952
- Jamesia ericksoni Hovore, 1989
- Jamesia fuscofasciata Dillon & Dillon, 1952
- Jamesia globifera (Fabricius, 1801)
- Jamesia lineata Fisher, 1926
- Jamesia multivittata Bates, 1869
- Jamesia papulenta Thomson, 1868
- Jamesia phileta Dillon & Dillon, 1945
- Jamesia pyropina Dillon & Dillon, 1945
- Jamesia ramirezi Nearns & Tavakilian, 2012
