= Lagocheirus praecellens =

Scientific classification
- Kingdom: Animalia
- Phylum: Arthropoda
- Clade: Pancrustacea
- Class: Insecta
- Order: Coleoptera
- Suborder: Polyphaga
- Infraorder: Cucujiformia
- Family: Cerambycidae
- Genus: Lagocheirus
- Species: L. praecellens

Binomial name
- Lagocheirus praecellens Bates, 1872

Species of beetle

Lagocheirus praecellens is a species of longhorn beetle in the subfamily Lamiinae. It was first described by Bates in 1872, and is known from Nicaragua and Panama.
