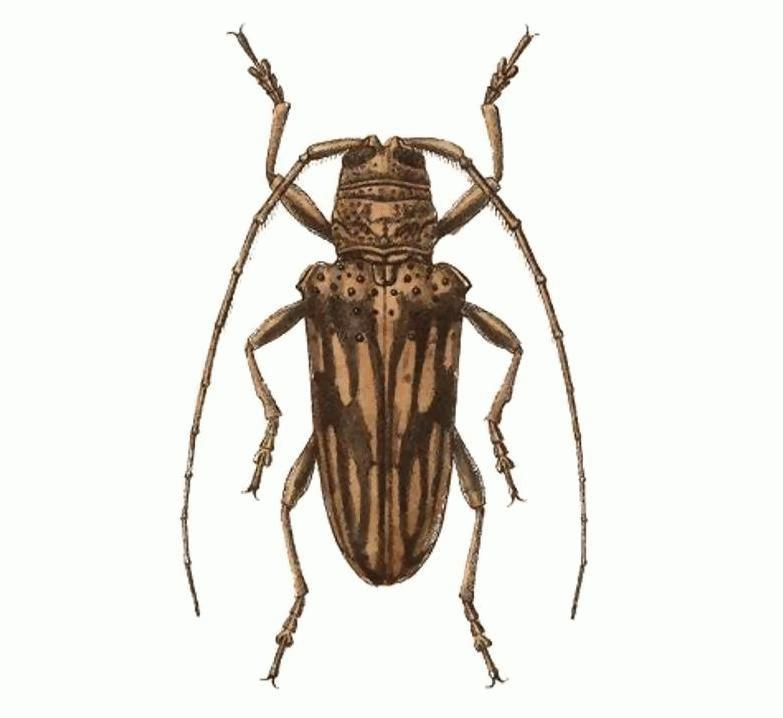

Scientific classification
- Kingdom: Animalia
- Phylum: Arthropoda
- Class: Insecta
- Order: Coleoptera
- Suborder: Polyphaga
- Infraorder: Cucujiformia
- Family: Cerambycidae
- Genus: Jamesia
- Species: J. multivittata

Binomial name
- Jamesia multivittata Bates, 1869

= Jamesia multivittata =

Species of beetle

Jamesia multivittata is a species of beetle in the family Cerambycidae. It was described by Henry Walter Bates in 1869. It is known from Nicaragua, Ecuador, Costa Rica, and Panama.
