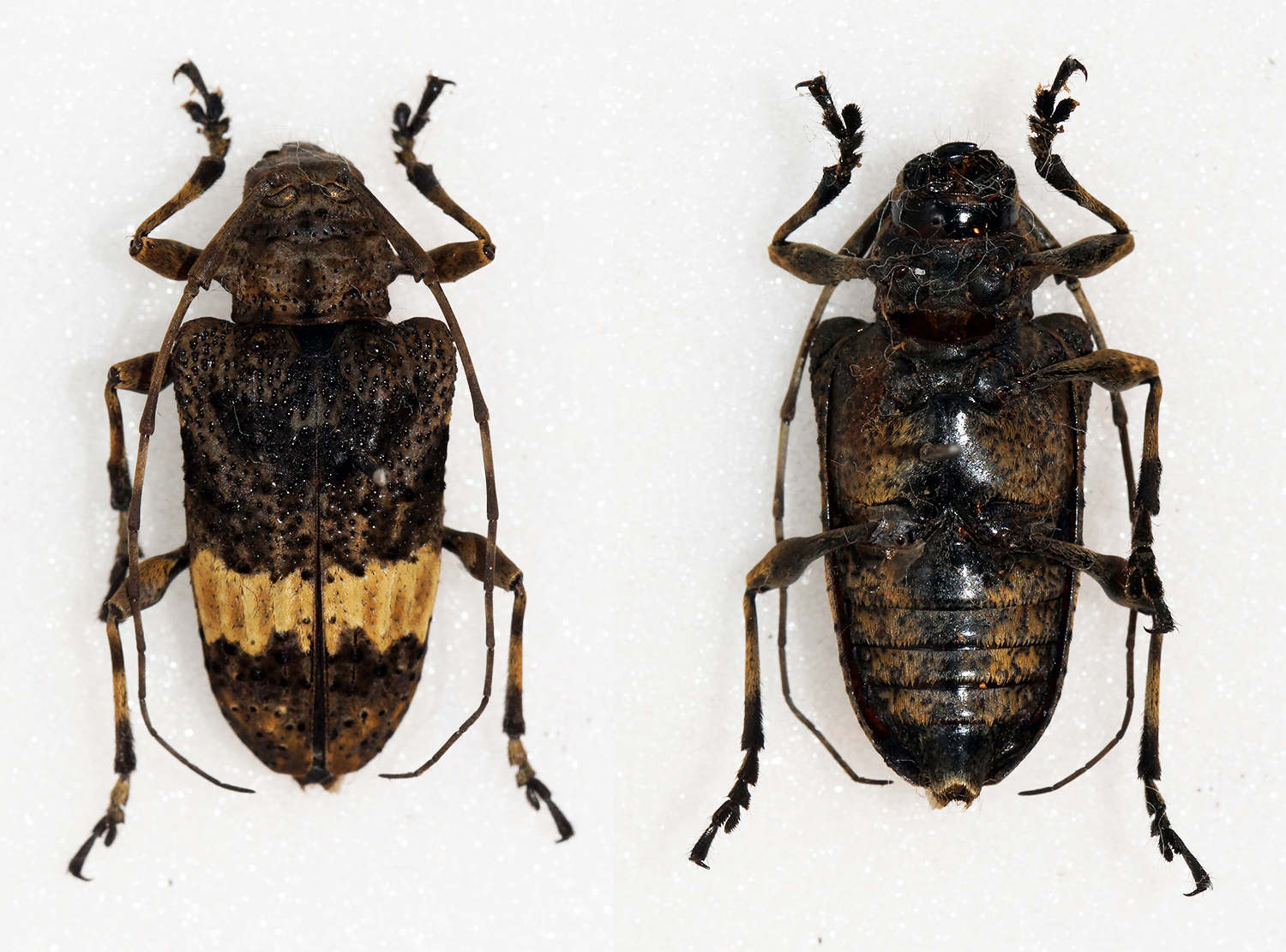
- Sex: Male, Size: 21mm

Scientific classification
- Domain: Eukaryota
- Kingdom: Animalia
- Phylum: Arthropoda
- Class: Insecta
- Order: Coleoptera
- Suborder: Polyphaga
- Infraorder: Cucujiformia
- Family: Cerambycidae
- Genus: Lagocheirus
- Species: L. kathleenae

Binomial name
- Lagocheirus kathleenae Hovore, 1998

= Lagocheirus kathleenae =

Species of beetle

Lagocheirus kathleenae is a species of longhorn beetles of the subfamily Lamiinae. It was described by Hovore in 1998, and is found in Costa Rica and Panama.
