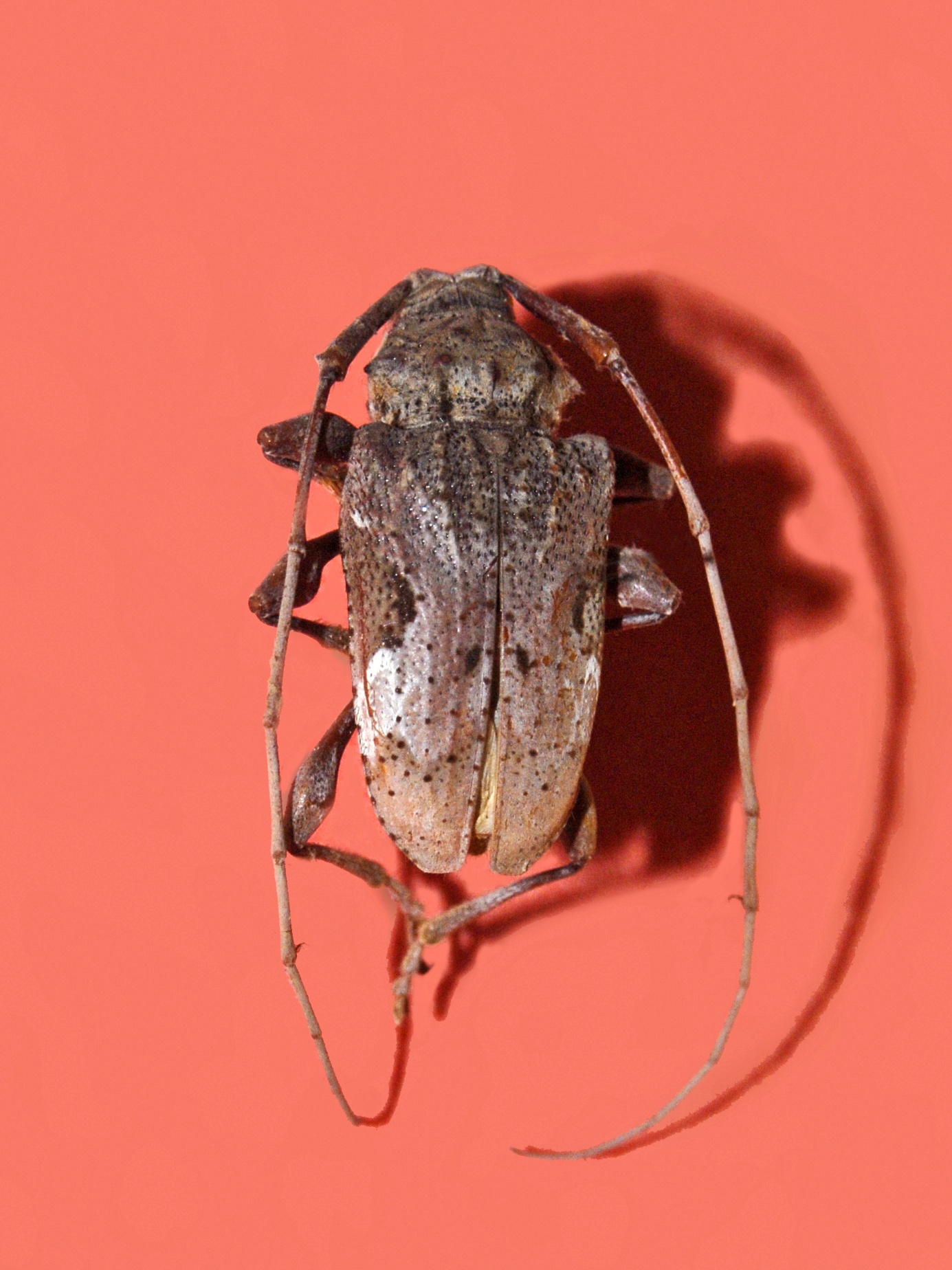
- Museum specimen

Scientific classification
- Kingdom: Animalia
- Phylum: Arthropoda
- Class: Insecta
- Order: Coleoptera
- Suborder: Polyphaga
- Infraorder: Cucujiformia
- Family: Cerambycidae
- Genus: Lagocheirus
- Species: L. araneiformis

Binomial name
- Lagocheirus araneiformis (Linnaeus, 1767)

Synonyms
- Cerambyx araneiformis Linnaeus, 1767; Cerambyx araneiformis ypsilon Voet, 1778 (Unav.); Lagochirus araneiformis (Linnaeus) Horn, 1880

= Lagocheirus araneiformis =

Species of beetle

Lagocheirus araneiformis is a species of longhorn beetle of the subfamily Lamiinae. It was described by Carl Linnaeus in his 1767 12th edition of Systema Naturae.

== Subspecies ==
- Lagocheirus araneiformis araneiformis (Linnaeus, 1767)
- Lagocheirus araneiformis curacaoensis Gilmour, 1968
- Lagocheirus araneiformis flavolineatus Aurivillius, 1921
- Lagocheirus araneiformis fulvescens Dillon, 1957
- Lagocheirus araneiformis guadeloupensis Dillon, 1957
- Lagocheirus araneiformis insulorum Dillon, 1957
- Lagocheirus araneiformis stroheckeri Dillon, 1956

== Description ==
Lagocheirus araneiformis can reach a length of 20–28 millimetres (0.79–1.10 in). The basic coloration of these longhorn beetles is grey brown. They are considered a pest of cassava (Manihot esculenta) and sugar cane (Saccharum species).

== Distribution ==
This species can be found in Mexico, Ecuador, Honduras, Antilles, Peru and Venezuela.
