= Jamesia fuscofasciata =

Scientific classification
- Kingdom: Animalia
- Phylum: Arthropoda
- Class: Insecta
- Order: Coleoptera
- Suborder: Polyphaga
- Infraorder: Cucujiformia
- Family: Cerambycidae
- Genus: Jamesia
- Species: J. fuscofasciata

Binomial name
- Jamesia fuscofasciata Dillon & Dillon, 1952

Species of beetle

Jamesia fuscofasciata is a species of beetle in the family Cerambycidae. It was described by Dillon and Dillon in 1952. It is known from Ecuador.
