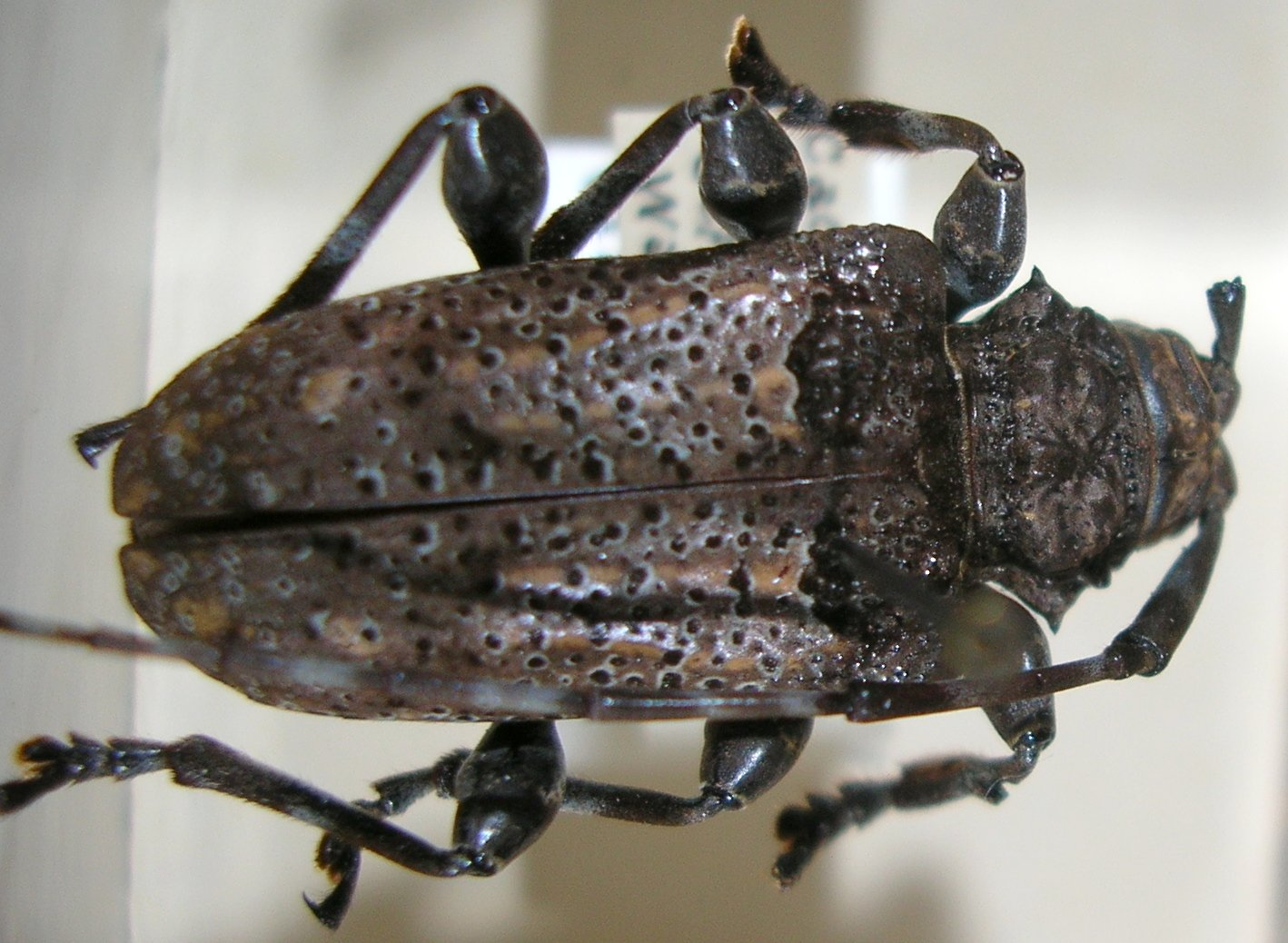

Scientific classification
- Domain: Eukaryota
- Kingdom: Animalia
- Phylum: Arthropoda
- Class: Insecta
- Order: Coleoptera
- Suborder: Polyphaga
- Infraorder: Cucujiformia
- Family: Cerambycidae
- Genus: Lagocheirus
- Species: L. funestus

Binomial name
- Lagocheirus funestus (Thomson, 1865)

= Lagocheirus funestus =

Species of beetle

Lagocheirus funestus is a species of longhorn beetles of the subfamily Lamiinae. It was described by Thomson in 1865. The species was redescribed by Dillon
