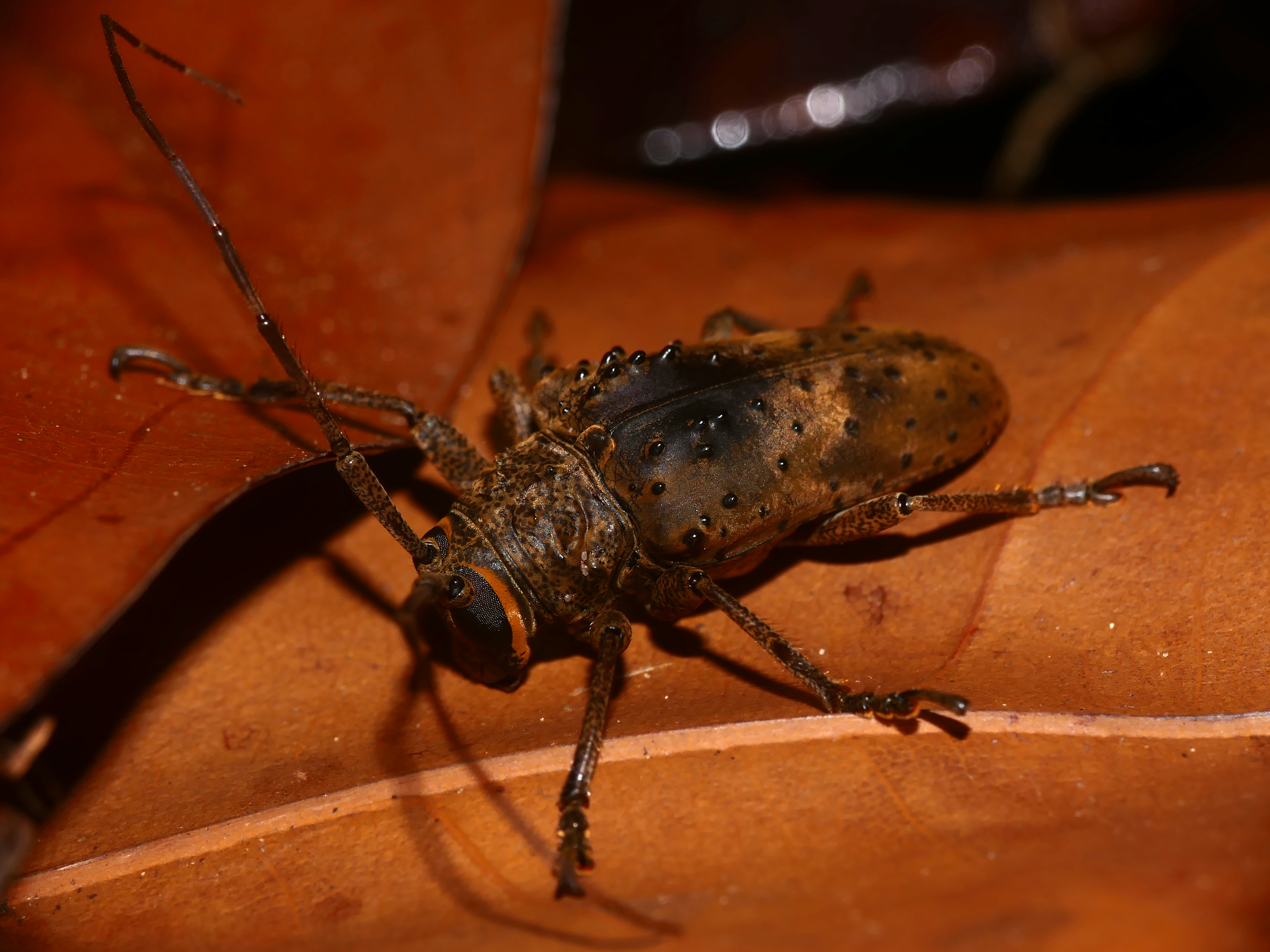

Scientific classification
- Kingdom: Animalia
- Phylum: Arthropoda
- Class: Insecta
- Order: Coleoptera
- Suborder: Polyphaga
- Infraorder: Cucujiformia
- Family: Cerambycidae
- Genus: Jamesia
- Species: J. globifera

Binomial name
- Jamesia globifera (Fabricius, 1801)

Synonyms
- Hypselomus globifer (Fabricius, 1801); Hypselomus varilosus Pascoe, 1859; Hypsioma gemmata Blanchard, 1843; Jamesia gemmata (Blanchard, 1843); Lamia globifera Fabricius, 1801

= Jamesia globifera =

Species of beetle

Jamesia globifera is a species of beetle in the family Cerambycidae. It was described by Johan Christian Fabricius in 1801. It is known from Costa Rica, Brazil, Bolivia, Colombia, Panama, French Guiana, Nicaragua, Ecuador, Peru, Suriname, Guyana, and Venezuela.
