= Jamesia ericksoni =

Scientific classification
- Kingdom: Animalia
- Phylum: Arthropoda
- Class: Insecta
- Order: Coleoptera
- Suborder: Polyphaga
- Infraorder: Cucujiformia
- Family: Cerambycidae
- Genus: Jamesia
- Species: J. ericksoni

Binomial name
- Jamesia ericksoni Hovore, 1989

Species of beetle

Jamesia ericksoni is a species of beetle in the family Cerambycidae. It was described by Hovore in 1989. It is known from Panama and Costa Rica.
