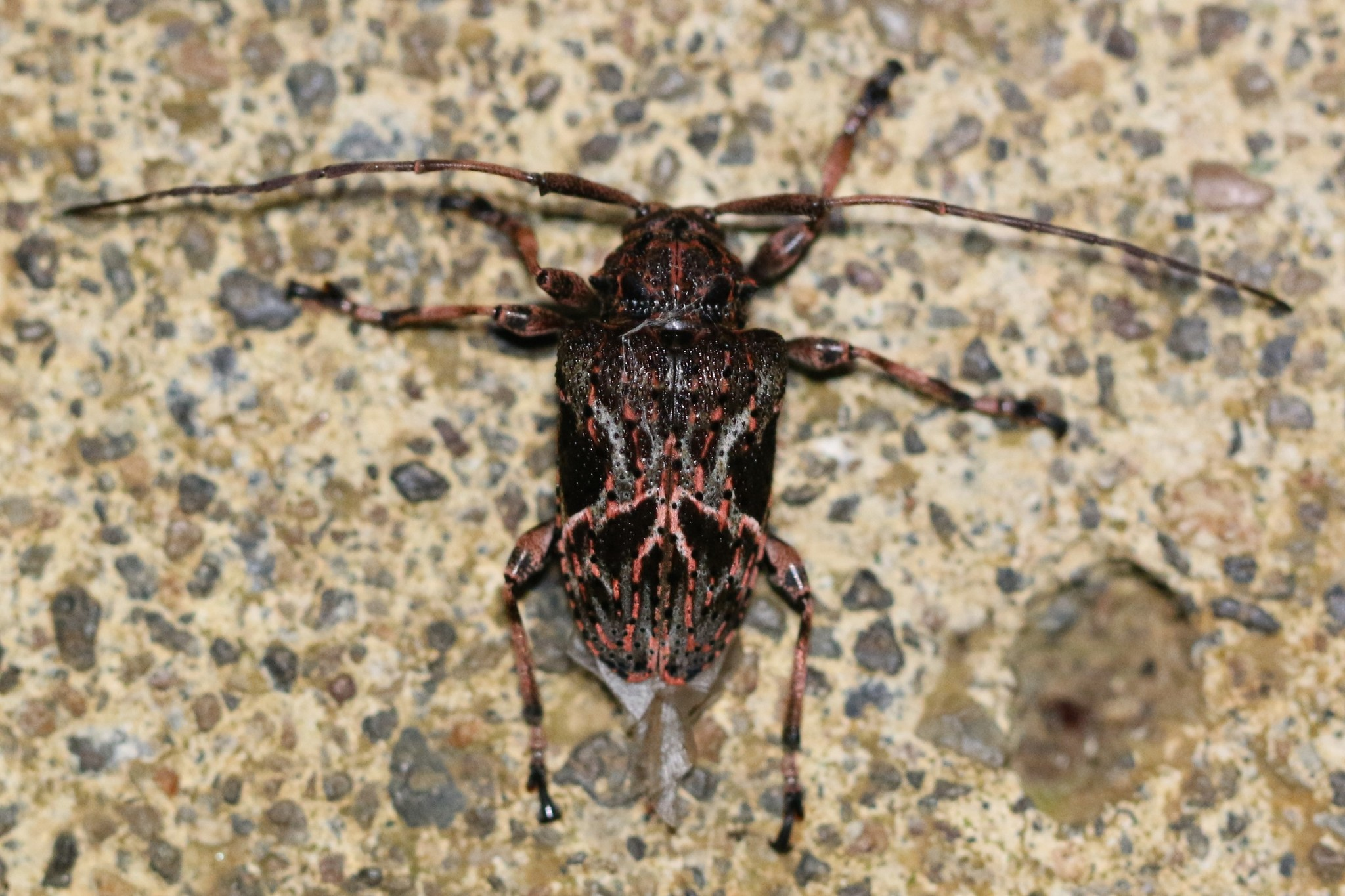

Scientific classification
- Kingdom: Animalia
- Phylum: Arthropoda
- Class: Insecta
- Order: Coleoptera
- Suborder: Polyphaga
- Infraorder: Cucujiformia
- Family: Cerambycidae
- Genus: Lagocheirus
- Species: L. rosaceus

Binomial name
- Lagocheirus rosaceus Bates, 1869

= Lagocheirus rosaceus =

Species of beetle

Lagocheirus rosaceus is a species of beetle in the family Cerambycidae.
