= Lochmaeocles sparsus =

Scientific classification
- Domain: Eukaryota
- Kingdom: Animalia
- Phylum: Arthropoda
- Class: Insecta
- Order: Coleoptera
- Suborder: Polyphaga
- Infraorder: Cucujiformia
- Family: Cerambycidae
- Genus: Lochmaeocles
- Species: L. sparsus

Binomial name
- Lochmaeocles sparsus (Bates, 1880)

Synonyms
- Oncideres callidryas var. Bates, 1880; Oncideres sparsa Bates, 1880; Oncoderes sparsa (Bates, 1880)

Species of beetle

Lochmaeocles sparsus is a species of beetle in the family Cerambycidae. It was described by Henry Walter Bates in 1880. It is known from Nicaragua, Honduras, Mexico, Costa Rica, and Panama.
