= Lochmaeocles tessellatus =

Scientific classification
- Domain: Eukaryota
- Kingdom: Animalia
- Phylum: Arthropoda
- Class: Insecta
- Order: Coleoptera
- Suborder: Polyphaga
- Infraorder: Cucujiformia
- Family: Cerambycidae
- Genus: Lochmaeocles
- Species: L. tessellatus

Binomial name
- Lochmaeocles tessellatus (Thomson, 1868)

Species of beetle

Lochmaeocles tessellatus is a species of beetle in the family Cerambycidae. It was described by James Thomson in 1868.

== Subspecies ==
- Lochmaeocles tessellatus costaricae Chemsak, 1986
- Lochmaeocles tessellatus tessellatus (Thomson, 1868)
