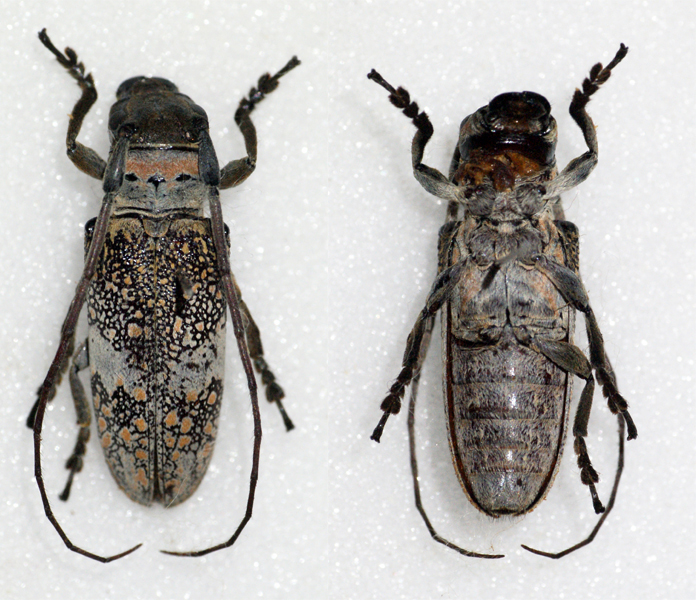

Scientific classification
- Domain: Eukaryota
- Kingdom: Animalia
- Phylum: Arthropoda
- Class: Insecta
- Order: Coleoptera
- Suborder: Polyphaga
- Infraorder: Cucujiformia
- Family: Cerambycidae
- Genus: Lochmaeocles
- Species: L. fasciatus

Binomial name
- Lochmaeocles fasciatus (H. Lucas in Laporte, 1857)

Synonyms
- Apocoptoma fasciatum (H. Lucas, 1857); Oncideres fasciata H. Lucas, 1857; Oncoderes fasciata (H. Lucas, 1857); Oncideres fasciatus (H. Lucas, 1857) (misspelling)

= Lochmaeocles fasciatus =

Species of beetle

Lochmaeocles fasciatus is a species of beetle in the family Cerambycidae. It was described by Hippolyte Lucas in 1857. It is known from Brazil, Paraguay, and Argentina.
