= Lochmaeocles callidryas =

Scientific classification
- Domain: Eukaryota
- Kingdom: Animalia
- Phylum: Arthropoda
- Class: Insecta
- Order: Coleoptera
- Suborder: Polyphaga
- Infraorder: Cucujiformia
- Family: Cerambycidae
- Genus: Lochmaeocles
- Species: L. callidryas

Binomial name
- Lochmaeocles callidryas (Bates, 1865)

Synonyms
- Oncideres callidryas Bates, 1872; Oncideres callidryas var. hembra Bates, 1880

Species of beetle

Lochmaeocles callidryas is a species of beetle in the family Cerambycidae, also known by the common name of twig girdler. It was described by Henry Walter Bates in 1865. It is known from Peru, Brazil, French Guiana, Ecuador, Guyana, Suriname, Bolivia, and Venezuela.
