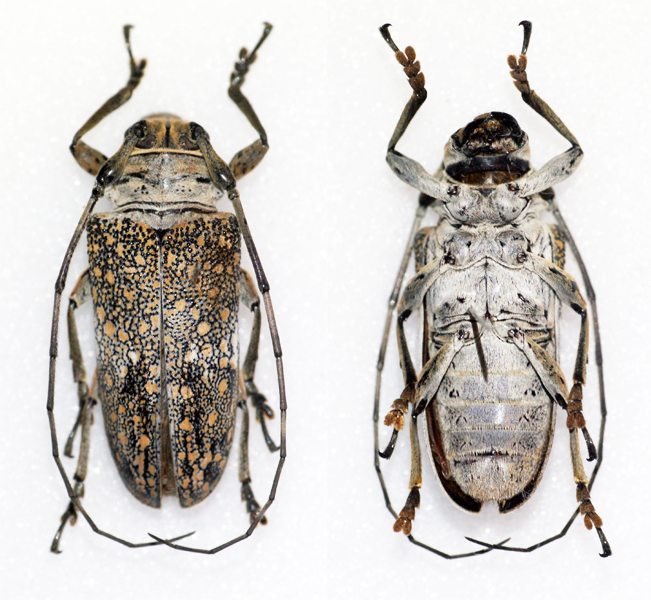

Scientific classification
- Domain: Eukaryota
- Kingdom: Animalia
- Phylum: Arthropoda
- Class: Insecta
- Order: Coleoptera
- Suborder: Polyphaga
- Infraorder: Cucujiformia
- Family: Cerambycidae
- Genus: Lochmaeocles
- Species: L. pulcher

Binomial name
- Lochmaeocles pulcher Dillon & Dillon, 1946

= Lochmaeocles pulcher =

Species of beetle

Lochmaeocles pulcher is a species of beetle in the family Cerambycidae. It was described by Dillon and Dillon in 1946. It is known from Brazil, Ecuador, Peru and French Guiana.
