= Lochmaeocles salvadorensis =

Scientific classification
- Domain: Eukaryota
- Kingdom: Animalia
- Phylum: Arthropoda
- Class: Insecta
- Order: Coleoptera
- Suborder: Polyphaga
- Infraorder: Cucujiformia
- Family: Cerambycidae
- Genus: Lochmaeocles
- Species: L. salvadorensis

Binomial name
- Lochmaeocles salvadorensis (Franz, 1954)

Synonyms
- Ischiomaeocles salvadorensis Franz, 1954

Species of beetle

Lochmaeocles salvadorensis is a species of beetle in the family Cerambycidae. It was described by Franz in 1954. It is known from El Salvador.
