= Lochmaeocles congener =

Scientific classification
- Domain: Eukaryota
- Kingdom: Animalia
- Phylum: Arthropoda
- Class: Insecta
- Order: Coleoptera
- Suborder: Polyphaga
- Infraorder: Cucujiformia
- Family: Cerambycidae
- Genus: Lochmaeocles
- Species: L. congener

Binomial name
- Lochmaeocles congener (Thomson, 1868)

Synonyms
- Lochmaeocles vermiculatus (Thomson) Dillon & Dillon, 1946; Oncideres congener Thomson, 1868; Oncideres vermiculata Thomson, 1868; Oncideres vermiculatus (Thomson) Lacordaire, 1872

Species of beetle

Lochmaeocles congener is a species of beetle in the family Cerambycidae. It was described by James Thomson in 1868. It is known from Brazil.
