= Lochmaeocles grisescens =

Scientific classification
- Domain: Eukaryota
- Kingdom: Animalia
- Phylum: Arthropoda
- Class: Insecta
- Order: Coleoptera
- Suborder: Polyphaga
- Infraorder: Cucujiformia
- Family: Cerambycidae
- Genus: Lochmaeocles
- Species: L. grisescens

Binomial name
- Lochmaeocles grisescens Noguera & Chemsak, 1993

Species of beetle

Lochmaeocles grisescens is a species of beetle in the family Cerambycidae. It was described by Noguera and Chemsak in 1993. It is known from Mexico.
