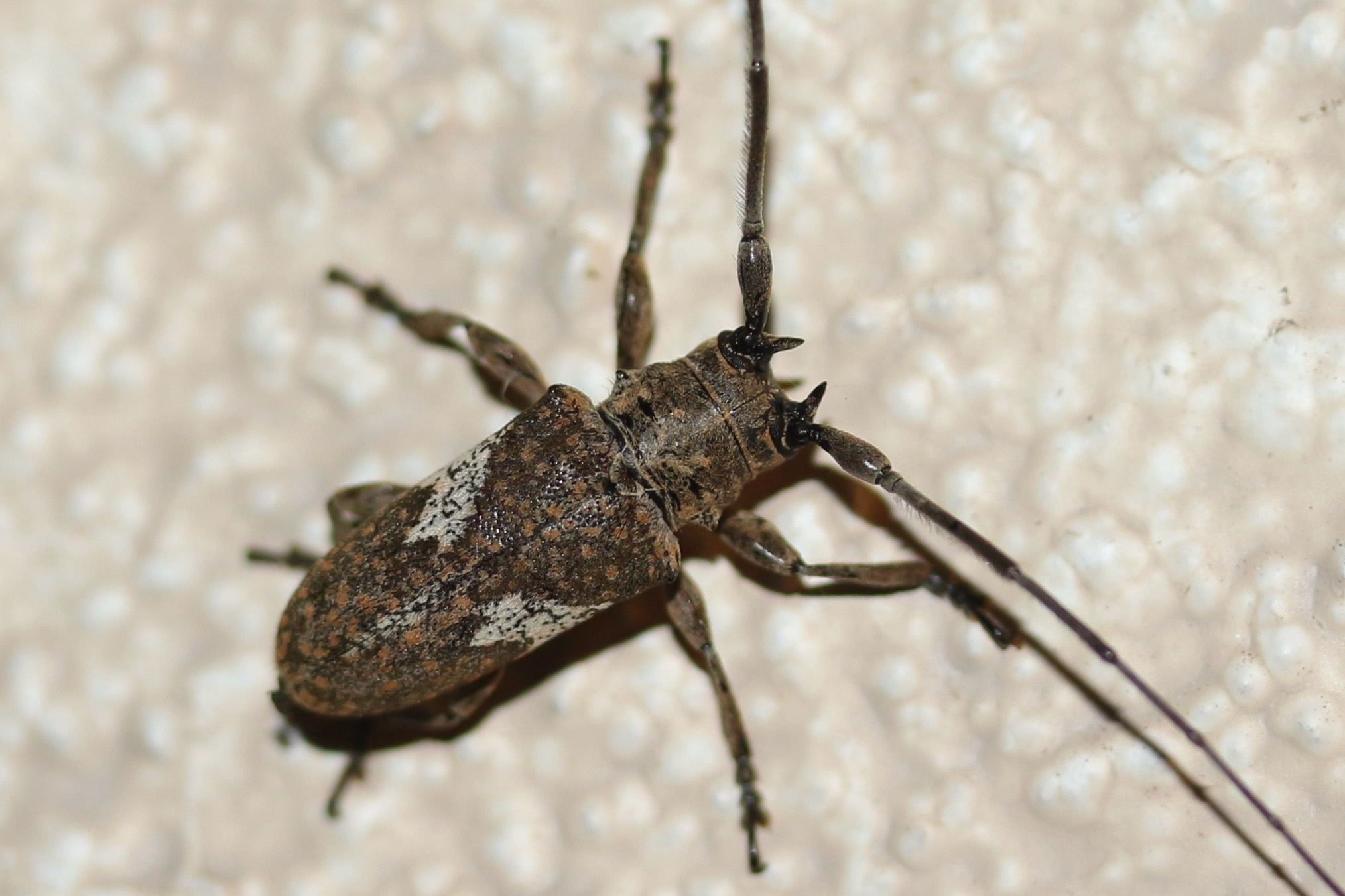
- Lochmaeocles cornuticeps federalis

Scientific classification
- Domain: Eukaryota
- Kingdom: Animalia
- Phylum: Arthropoda
- Class: Insecta
- Order: Coleoptera
- Suborder: Polyphaga
- Infraorder: Cucujiformia
- Family: Cerambycidae
- Genus: Lochmaeocles
- Species: L. cornuticeps

Binomial name
- Lochmaeocles cornuticeps Schaeffer, 1906

= Lochmaeocles cornuticeps =

Species of beetle

Lochmaeocles cornuticeps is a species of beetle in the family Cerambycidae. It was described by Schaeffer in 1906.

== Subspecies ==
- Lochmaeocles cornuticeps cornuticeps Schaeffer, 1906
- Lochmaeocles cornuticeps federalis Dillon & Dillon, 1946
- Lochmaeocles cornuticeps pacificus Dillon & Dillon, 1946
