= Lochmaeocles cretatus =

Scientific classification
- Domain: Eukaryota
- Kingdom: Animalia
- Phylum: Arthropoda
- Class: Insecta
- Order: Coleoptera
- Suborder: Polyphaga
- Infraorder: Cucujiformia
- Family: Cerambycidae
- Genus: Lochmaeocles
- Species: L. cretatus

Binomial name
- Lochmaeocles cretatus Chemsak & Linsley, 1986

Species of beetle

Lochmaeocles cretatus is a species of beetle in the family Cerambycidae. It was described by Chemsak and Linsley in 1986. It is known from Mexico.
