= Lochmaeocles batesi =

Scientific classification
- Domain: Eukaryota
- Kingdom: Animalia
- Phylum: Arthropoda
- Class: Insecta
- Order: Coleoptera
- Suborder: Polyphaga
- Infraorder: Cucujiformia
- Family: Cerambycidae
- Genus: Lochmaeocles
- Species: L. batesi

Binomial name
- Lochmaeocles batesi (Aurivillius, 1923)

Synonyms
- Oncideres callidryas var. batesi Aurivillius, 1923

Species of beetle

Lochmaeocles batesi is a species of beetle in the family Cerambycidae. It was described by Per Olof Christopher Aurivillius in 1923. It is known from Ecuador, Costa Rica, Guatemala, Nicaragua, Honduras, Mexico, Colombia, and Panama.
