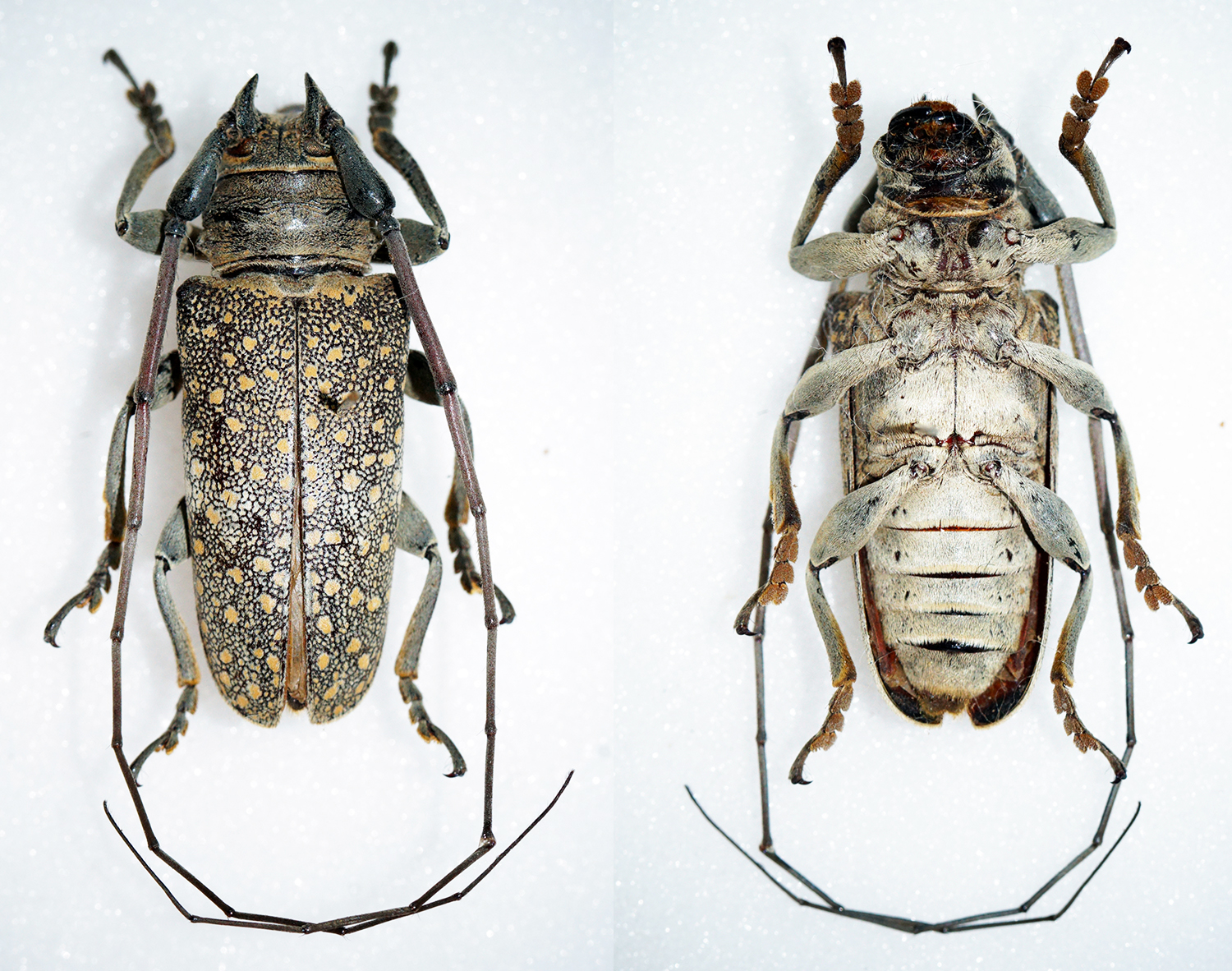

Scientific classification
- Domain: Eukaryota
- Kingdom: Animalia
- Phylum: Arthropoda
- Class: Insecta
- Order: Coleoptera
- Suborder: Polyphaga
- Infraorder: Cucujiformia
- Family: Cerambycidae
- Genus: Lochmaeocles
- Species: L. sladeni

Binomial name
- Lochmaeocles sladeni (Gahan, 1903)

Synonyms
- Oncideres sladeni Gahan in Gahan & Arrow, 1903

= Lochmaeocles sladeni =

Species of beetle

Lochmaeocles sladeni is a species of beetle in the family Cerambycidae. It was described by Charles Joseph Gahan in 1903. It is known from Paraguay, Argentina, Brazil and Uruguay.
