= Lochmaeocles vestitus =

Scientific classification
- Domain: Eukaryota
- Kingdom: Animalia
- Phylum: Arthropoda
- Class: Insecta
- Order: Coleoptera
- Suborder: Polyphaga
- Infraorder: Cucujiformia
- Family: Cerambycidae
- Genus: Lochmaeocles
- Species: L. vestitus

Binomial name
- Lochmaeocles vestitus (Bates, 1885)

Synonyms
- Oncideres tessellata var. vestita Bates, 1885

Species of beetle

Lochmaeocles vestitus is a species of beetle in the family Cerambycidae. It was described by Henry Walter Bates in 1885. It is known from Mexico.
