= Lochmaeocles pseudovestitus =

Scientific classification
- Domain: Eukaryota
- Kingdom: Animalia
- Phylum: Arthropoda
- Class: Insecta
- Order: Coleoptera
- Suborder: Polyphaga
- Infraorder: Cucujiformia
- Family: Cerambycidae
- Genus: Lochmaeocles
- Species: L. pseudovestitus

Binomial name
- Lochmaeocles pseudovestitus Chemsak & Linsley, 1988

Species of beetle

Lochmaeocles pseudovestitus is a species of beetle in the family Cerambycidae. It was described by Chemsak and Linsley in 1988. It is known from Mexico.
