= Lochmaeocles consobrinus =

Scientific classification
- Domain: Eukaryota
- Kingdom: Animalia
- Phylum: Arthropoda
- Class: Insecta
- Order: Coleoptera
- Suborder: Polyphaga
- Infraorder: Cucujiformia
- Family: Cerambycidae
- Genus: Lochmaeocles
- Species: L. consobrinus

Binomial name
- Lochmaeocles consobrinus Dillon & Dillon, 1946

Species of beetle

Lochmaeocles consobrinus is a species of beetle in the family Cerambycidae. It was described by Dillon and Dillon in 1946.

== Subspecies ==
- Lochmaeocles consobrinus bolivianus Dillon & Dillon, 1946
- Lochmaeocles consobrinus consobrinus Dillon & Dillon, 1946
