= Lochmaeocles confertus =

Scientific classification
- Domain: Eukaryota
- Kingdom: Animalia
- Phylum: Arthropoda
- Class: Insecta
- Order: Coleoptera
- Suborder: Polyphaga
- Infraorder: Cucujiformia
- Family: Cerambycidae
- Genus: Lochmaeocles
- Species: L. confertus

Binomial name
- Lochmaeocles confertus (Aurivillius, 1923)

Synonyms
- Oncideres tessellatus var. conferta Aurivillius, 1923

Species of beetle

Lochmaeocles confertus is a species of beetle in the family Cerambycidae. It was described by Per Olof Christopher Aurivillius in 1923. It is known from Guatemala and Mexico.
