= Lochmaeocles marmoratus =

Scientific classification
- Kingdom: Animalia
- Phylum: Arthropoda
- Class: Insecta
- Order: Coleoptera
- Suborder: Polyphaga
- Infraorder: Cucujiformia
- Family: Cerambycidae
- Genus: Lochmaeocles
- Species: L. marmoratus

Binomial name
- Lochmaeocles marmoratus Casey, 1913

Synonyms
- Oncideres marmorata Aurivillius, 1923; Oncideres tesselatus Schaeffer, 1906; Oncideres tessellatus Snow, 1906

Species of beetle

Lochmaeocles marmoratus is a species of beetle in the family Cerambycidae. It was described by Casey in 1913. It is known from the United States and Mexico.
