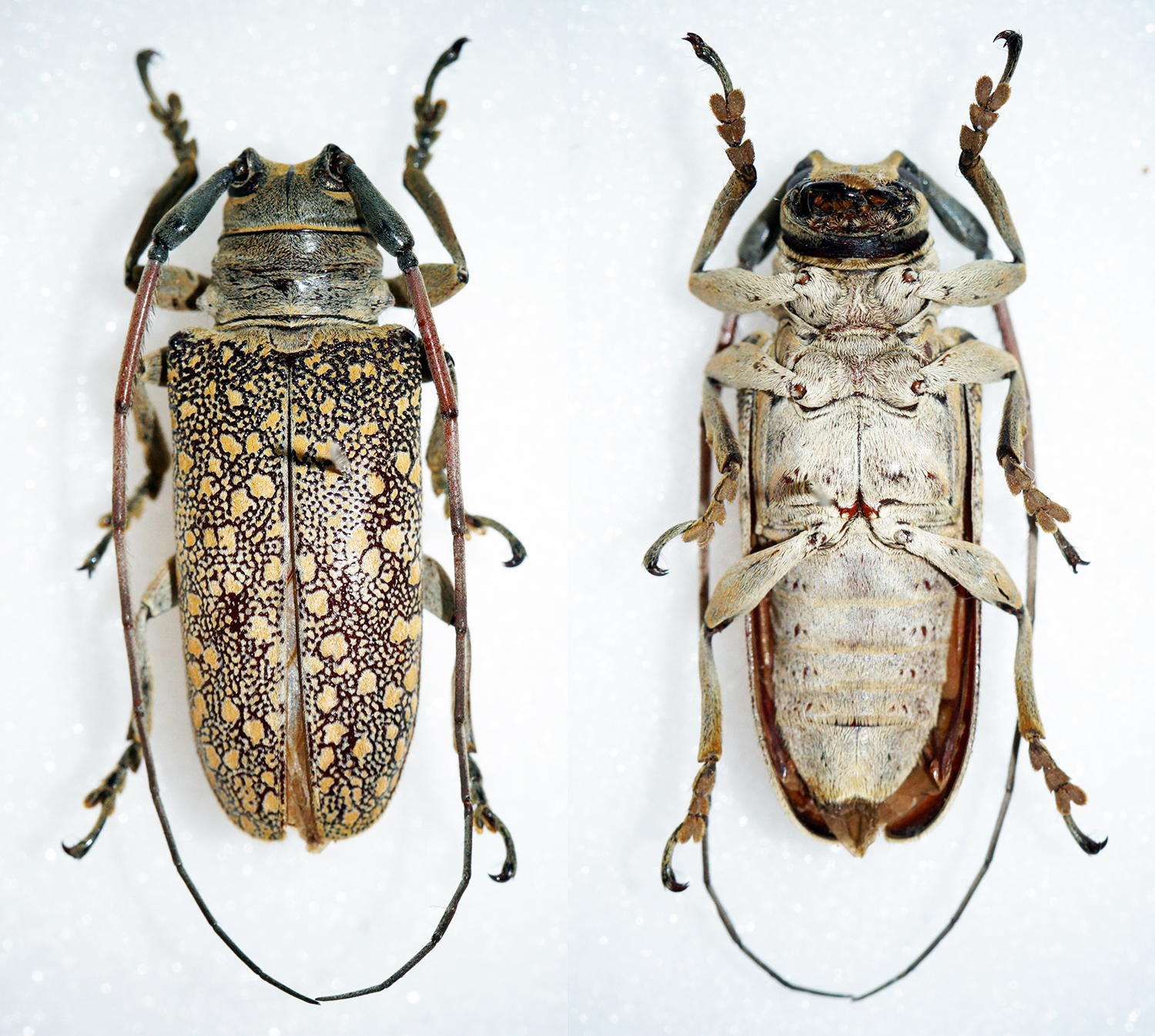
- Lochmaeocles sladeni (female)

Scientific classification
- Domain: Eukaryota
- Kingdom: Animalia
- Phylum: Arthropoda
- Class: Insecta
- Order: Coleoptera
- Suborder: Polyphaga
- Infraorder: Cucujiformia
- Family: Cerambycidae
- Subfamily: Lamiinae
- Tribe: Onciderini
- Genus: Lochmaeocles; Bates, 1880

= Lochmaeocles =

Genus of beetles

Lochmaeocles is a genus of longhorn beetles of the subfamily Lamiinae, containing the following species:

- Lochmaeocles alboplagiatus Dillon & Dillon, 1946
- Lochmaeocles basalis Dillon & Dillon, 1946
- Lochmaeocles batesi (Aurivillius, 1923)
- Lochmaeocles callidryas (Bates, 1865)
- Lochmaeocles confertus (Aurivillius, 1923)
- Lochmaeocles congener (Thomson, 1868)
- Lochmaeocles consobrinus Dillon & Dillon, 1946
- Lochmaeocles cornuticeps Schaeffer, 1906
- Lochmaeocles cretatus Chemsak & Linsley, 1986
- Lochmaeocles fasciatus (Lucas in Laporte, 1857)
- Lochmaeocles grisescens Noguera & Chemsak, 1993
- Lochmaeocles hondurensis Dillon & Dillon, 1946
- Lochmaeocles laticinctus Dillon & Dillon, 1946
- Lochmaeocles leuripennis Martins & Galileo, 1995
- Lochmaeocles marmoratus Casey, 1913
- Lochmaeocles nigritarsus Chemsak & Linsley, 1986
- Lochmaeocles obliquatus Dillon & Dillon, 1946
- Lochmaeocles pseudovestitus Chemsak & Linsley, 1988
- Lochmaeocles pulcher Dillon & Dillon, 1946
- Lochmaeocles salvadorensis (Franz, 1954)
- Lochmaeocles sladeni (Gahan, 1903)
- Lochmaeocles sparsus (Bates, 1880)
- Lochmaeocles tessellatus (Thomson, 1868)
- Lochmaeocles vestitus (Bates, 1885)
- Lochmaeocles zonatus Dillon & Dillon, 1946
