= Cacostola vagelineata =

Scientific classification
- Kingdom: Animalia
- Phylum: Arthropoda
- Class: Insecta
- Order: Coleoptera
- Suborder: Polyphaga
- Infraorder: Cucujiformia
- Family: Cerambycidae
- Genus: Cacostola
- Species: C. vagelineata

Binomial name
- Cacostola vagelineata Fairmaire & Germain, 1859

Synonyms
- Trestonia vagelineata Gemminger & Harold, 1873

Species of beetle

Cacostola vagelineata is a species of beetle in the family Cerambycidae. It was described by Fairmaire and Germain in 1859. It is known from Chile.
