= Cacostola acuticauda =

Scientific classification
- Kingdom: Animalia
- Phylum: Arthropoda
- Class: Insecta
- Order: Coleoptera
- Suborder: Polyphaga
- Infraorder: Cucujiformia
- Family: Cerambycidae
- Genus: Cacostola
- Species: C. acuticauda

Binomial name
- Cacostola acuticauda Marinoni & Martins, 1982

Species of beetle

Cacostola acuticauda is a species of beetle in the family Cerambycidae. It was described by Marinoni and Martins in 1982. It is known from Brazil and Costa Rica.
