= Cacostola gracilis =

Scientific classification
- Kingdom: Animalia
- Phylum: Arthropoda
- Class: Insecta
- Order: Coleoptera
- Suborder: Polyphaga
- Infraorder: Cucujiformia
- Family: Cerambycidae
- Genus: Cacostola
- Species: C. gracilis

Binomial name
- Cacostola gracilis Marinoni & Martins, 1982

Species of beetle

Cacostola gracilis is a species of beetle in the family Cerambycidae. It was described by Marinoni and Martins in 1982. It is known from Brazil.
