= Cacostola obliquata =

Scientific classification
- Kingdom: Animalia
- Phylum: Arthropoda
- Class: Insecta
- Order: Coleoptera
- Suborder: Polyphaga
- Infraorder: Cucujiformia
- Family: Cerambycidae
- Genus: Cacostola
- Species: C. obliquata

Binomial name
- Cacostola obliquata Martins & Galileo, 1995

Species of beetle

Cacostola obliquata is a species of beetle in the family Cerambycidae. It was described by Martins and Galileo in 1995. It is known from Ecuador.
