= Cacostola salicicola =

Scientific classification
- Kingdom: Animalia
- Phylum: Arthropoda
- Class: Insecta
- Order: Coleoptera
- Suborder: Polyphaga
- Infraorder: Cucujiformia
- Family: Cerambycidae
- Genus: Cacostola
- Species: C. salicicola

Binomial name
- Cacostola salicicola (Linsley, 1934)

Synonyms
- Cylindrataxia salicicola Linsley, 1934

Species of beetle

Cacostola salicicola is a species of beetle in the family Cerambycidae. It was described by Linsley in 1934. It is known from Mexico and the United States.
