= Cacostola =

Scientific classification
- Kingdom: Animalia
- Phylum: Arthropoda
- Class: Insecta
- Order: Coleoptera
- Suborder: Polyphaga
- Infraorder: Cucujiformia
- Family: Cerambycidae
- Subfamily: Lamiinae
- Tribe: Onciderini
- Genus: Cacostola; Fairmaire & Germain, 1859

Genus of beetles

Cacostola is a genus of longhorn beetles of the subfamily Lamiinae, containing the following species:

- Cacostola acuticauda Marinoni & Martins, 1982
- Cacostola apyraiuba Martins & Galileo, 2008
- Cacostola bimaculata Martins, Galileo & de Oliveira, 2009
- Cacostola brasiliensis Thomson, 1868
- Cacostola cana Marinoni & Martins, 1982
- Cacostola clorinda Dillon & Dillon, 1946
- Cacostola colombiana Martins & Galileo, 1999
- Cacostola flexicornis Bates, 1865
- Cacostola fusca Thomson, 1868
- Cacostola fuscata Dillon & Dillon, 1952
- Cacostola gracilis Marinoni & Martins, 1982
- Cacostola grisea Dillon & Dillon, 1946
- Cacostola janzeni Chemsak & Linsley, 1986
- Cacostola leonensis Dillon & Dillon, 1946
- Cacostola lineata (Hamilton in Leng & Hamilton, 1896)
- Cacostola mexicana (Breuning, 1943)
- Cacostola nelsoni Chemsak & Linsley, 1986
- Cacostola nordestina Martins & Galileo, 1999
- Cacostola obliquata Martins & Galileo, 1995
- Cacostola ornata Fleutiaux & Sallé, 1899
- Cacostola parafusca Martins, Galileo & de Oliveira, 2009
- Cacostola rugicollis Bates, 1885
- Cacostola salicicola (Linsley, 1934)
- Cacostola simplex (Pascoe, 1859)
- Cacostola sirena Dillon & Dillon, 1946
- Cacostola strandi (Breuning, 1943)
- Cacostola sulcipennis Melzer, 1934
- Cacostola vagelineata Fairmaire & Germain, 1859
- Cacostola vanini Martins, 1979
- Cacostola variegata Dillon & Dillon, 1946
- Cacostola volvula (Fabricius, 1781)
- Cacostola zanoa Dillon & Dillon, 1946
