= Cacostola nelsoni =

Scientific classification
- Kingdom: Animalia
- Phylum: Arthropoda
- Class: Insecta
- Order: Coleoptera
- Suborder: Polyphaga
- Infraorder: Cucujiformia
- Family: Cerambycidae
- Genus: Cacostola
- Species: C. nelsoni

Binomial name
- Cacostola nelsoni Chemsak & Linsley, 1986

Species of beetle

Cacostola nelsoni is a species of beetle in the family Cerambycidae. It was described by Chemsak and Linsley in 1986. It is known from Mexico.
