= Cacostola ornata =

Scientific classification
- Kingdom: Animalia
- Phylum: Arthropoda
- Class: Insecta
- Order: Coleoptera
- Suborder: Polyphaga
- Infraorder: Cucujiformia
- Family: Cerambycidae
- Genus: Cacostola
- Species: C. ornata

Binomial name
- Cacostola ornata Fleutiaux & Sallé, 1899

Synonyms
- Hyagniellus strandi Breuning, 1943

Species of beetle

Cacostola ornata is a species of beetle in the family Cerambycidae. It was described by Fleutiaux and Sallé in 1899. It is known from Grenada, Barbados, Martinique, and Guadeloupe.
