= Cacostola flexicornis =

Scientific classification
- Kingdom: Animalia
- Phylum: Arthropoda
- Class: Insecta
- Order: Coleoptera
- Suborder: Polyphaga
- Infraorder: Cucujiformia
- Family: Cerambycidae
- Genus: Cacostola
- Species: C. flexicornis

Binomial name
- Cacostola flexicornis Bates, 1865

Synonyms
- Cacostola flexicornus Dillon & Dillon, 1946; Trestonia flexicornis Gemminger & Harold, 1873

Species of beetle

Cacostola flexicornis is a species of beetle in the family Cerambycidae. It was described by Henry Walter Bates in 1865. It is known from Venezuela, Brazil and French Guiana.
