= Cacostola vanini =

Scientific classification
- Kingdom: Animalia
- Phylum: Arthropoda
- Class: Insecta
- Order: Coleoptera
- Suborder: Polyphaga
- Infraorder: Cucujiformia
- Family: Cerambycidae
- Genus: Cacostola
- Species: C. vanini

Binomial name
- Cacostola vanini Martins, 1979

Species of beetle

Cacostola vanini is a species of beetle in the family Cerambycidae. It was described by Martins in 1979. It is known from Brazil.
