= Cacostola sirena =

Scientific classification
- Kingdom: Animalia
- Phylum: Arthropoda
- Class: Insecta
- Order: Coleoptera
- Suborder: Polyphaga
- Infraorder: Cucujiformia
- Family: Cerambycidae
- Genus: Cacostola
- Species: C. sirena

Binomial name
- Cacostola sirena Dillon & Dillon, 1946

Species of beetle

Cacostola sirena is a species of beetle in the family Cerambycidae. It was described by Dillon and Dillon in 1946. It is known from Venezuela.
