= Cacostola lineata =

Scientific classification
- Kingdom: Animalia
- Phylum: Arthropoda
- Class: Insecta
- Order: Coleoptera
- Suborder: Polyphaga
- Infraorder: Cucujiformia
- Family: Cerambycidae
- Genus: Cacostola
- Species: C. lineata

Binomial name
- Cacostola lineata (Hamilton in Leng & Hamilton, 1896)

Synonyms
- Aporataxia lineata Hamilton in Leng & Hamilton, 1896

Species of beetle

Cacostola lineata is a species of beetle in the family Cerambycidae. It was described by Hamilton in 1896. It is known from United States.
