= Cacostola brasiliensis =

Scientific classification
- Kingdom: Animalia
- Phylum: Arthropoda
- Class: Insecta
- Order: Coleoptera
- Suborder: Polyphaga
- Infraorder: Cucujiformia
- Family: Cerambycidae
- Genus: Cacostola
- Species: C. brasiliensis

Binomial name
- Cacostola brasiliensis Thomson, 1868

Synonyms
- Trestonia brasiliensis Gemminger & Harold, 1873

Species of beetle

Cacostola brasiliensis is a species of beetle in the family Cerambycidae. It was described by James Thomson in 1868. It is known from Brazil.
