= Cacostola mexicana =

Scientific classification
- Kingdom: Animalia
- Phylum: Arthropoda
- Class: Insecta
- Order: Coleoptera
- Suborder: Polyphaga
- Infraorder: Cucujiformia
- Family: Cerambycidae
- Genus: Cacostola
- Species: C. mexicana

Binomial name
- Cacostola mexicana (Breuning, 1943)

Synonyms
- Paratucumaniella mexicana Breuning, 1943

Species of longhorn beetle found in Mexico

Cacostola mexicana is a species of longhorn beetle in the family Cerambycidae. It was first described by Stephan von Breuning in 1943 and is native to Mexico.
