= Cacostola leonensis =

Scientific classification
- Kingdom: Animalia
- Phylum: Arthropoda
- Class: Insecta
- Order: Coleoptera
- Suborder: Polyphaga
- Infraorder: Cucujiformia
- Family: Cerambycidae
- Genus: Cacostola
- Species: C. leonensis

Binomial name
- Cacostola leonensis Dillon & Dillon, 1946

Species of beetle

Cacostola leonensis is a species of beetle in the family Cerambycidae that was described by Dillon and Dillon in 1946 and occurs in Puerto Rico.
