= Cacostola simplex =

Scientific classification
- Kingdom: Animalia
- Phylum: Arthropoda
- Class: Insecta
- Order: Coleoptera
- Suborder: Polyphaga
- Infraorder: Cucujiformia
- Family: Cerambycidae
- Genus: Cacostola
- Species: C. simplex

Binomial name
- Cacostola simplex (Pascoe, 1859)

Synonyms
- Pachypeza simplex Pascoe, 1859; Trestonia simplex Gemminger & Harold, 1873

Species of beetle

Cacostola simplex is a species of beetle in the family Cerambycidae. It was described by Francis Polkinghorne Pascoe in 1859. It is known from French Guiana and Brazil.
