= Cacostola bimaculata =

Scientific classification
- Kingdom: Animalia
- Phylum: Arthropoda
- Class: Insecta
- Order: Coleoptera
- Suborder: Polyphaga
- Infraorder: Cucujiformia
- Family: Cerambycidae
- Genus: Cacostola
- Species: C. bimaculata

Binomial name
- Cacostola bimaculata Martins, Galileo & de Oliveira, 2009

Species of beetle

Cacostola bimaculata is a species of beetle in the family Cerambycidae. It was described by Martins, Galileo and de Oliveira in 2009.
