= Cacostola janzeni =

Scientific classification
- Kingdom: Animalia
- Phylum: Arthropoda
- Class: Insecta
- Order: Coleoptera
- Suborder: Polyphaga
- Infraorder: Cucujiformia
- Family: Cerambycidae
- Genus: Cacostola
- Species: C. janzeni

Binomial name
- Cacostola janzeni Chemsak & Linsley, 1986

Species of beetle

Cacostola janzeni is a species of beetle in the family Cerambycidae. It was described by Chemsak and Linsley in 1986. It is known from Honduras and Mexico.
