= Cacostola volvula =

Scientific classification
- Kingdom: Animalia
- Phylum: Arthropoda
- Class: Insecta
- Order: Coleoptera
- Suborder: Polyphaga
- Infraorder: Cucujiformia
- Family: Cerambycidae
- Genus: Cacostola
- Species: C. volvula

Binomial name
- Cacostola volvula (Fabricius, 1781)

Synonyms
- Cacostola nitida Dillon & Dillon, 1946; Cerambyx volvulus Gmelin, 1790; Saperda volvula Blackwelder, 1946; Saperda volvulus Fabricius, 1781

Species of beetle

Cacostola volvula is a species of beetle in the family Cerambycidae. It was described by Johan Christian Fabricius in 1781. It is known from Bolivia, French Guiana and Brazil.
