= Trachysomus hydaspes =

Scientific classification
- Domain: Eukaryota
- Kingdom: Animalia
- Phylum: Arthropoda
- Class: Insecta
- Order: Coleoptera
- Suborder: Polyphaga
- Infraorder: Cucujiformia
- Family: Cerambycidae
- Genus: Trachysomus
- Species: T. hydaspes

Binomial name
- Trachysomus hydaspes Dillon & Dillon, 1946

Species of beetle

Trachysomus hydaspes is a species of beetle in the family Cerambycidae. It was described by Dillon and Dillon in 1946. It is known from Guyana and French Guiana.
