= Trachysomus peregrinus =

Scientific classification
- Domain: Eukaryota
- Kingdom: Animalia
- Phylum: Arthropoda
- Class: Insecta
- Order: Coleoptera
- Suborder: Polyphaga
- Infraorder: Cucujiformia
- Family: Cerambycidae
- Genus: Trachysomus
- Species: T. peregrinus

Binomial name
- Trachysomus peregrinus Thomson, 1858

Species of beetle

Trachysomus peregrinus is a species of beetle in the family Cerambycidae. It was described by James Thomson in 1858. It is known from Brazil, Panama and French Guiana.
