= Trachysomus verrucosus =

Scientific classification
- Kingdom: Animalia
- Phylum: Arthropoda
- Clade: Pancrustacea
- Class: Insecta
- Order: Coleoptera
- Suborder: Polyphaga
- Infraorder: Cucujiformia
- Family: Cerambycidae
- Genus: Trachysomus
- Species: T. verrucosus

Binomial name
- Trachysomus verrucosus (Olivier, 1797)

Synonyms
- Cerambyx dromedarius Voet, 1781 (Unav.); Lamia verrucosa Olivier, 1797; Trachysomus elephas Buquet, 1852

Species of beetle

Trachysomus verrucosus is a species of beetle in the family Cerambycidae from French Guiana, Brazil, and Panama. It was described by Guillaume-Antoine Olivier in 1797.
