= Trachysomus wappesi =

Scientific classification
- Domain: Eukaryota
- Kingdom: Animalia
- Phylum: Arthropoda
- Class: Insecta
- Order: Coleoptera
- Suborder: Polyphaga
- Infraorder: Cucujiformia
- Family: Cerambycidae
- Genus: Trachysomus
- Species: T. wappesi

Binomial name
- Trachysomus wappesi Martins & Galileo, 2009

Species of beetle

Trachysomus wappesi is a species of beetle in the family Cerambycidae. It was described by Martins and Galileo in 2009. It is known from Trinidad and Tobago.
