= Trachysomus luederwaldti =

Scientific classification
- Domain: Eukaryota
- Kingdom: Animalia
- Phylum: Arthropoda
- Class: Insecta
- Order: Coleoptera
- Suborder: Polyphaga
- Infraorder: Cucujiformia
- Family: Cerambycidae
- Genus: Trachysomus
- Species: T. luederwaldti

Binomial name
- Trachysomus luederwaldti Martins, 1975

Species of beetle

Trachysomus luederwaldti is a species of beetle in the family Cerambycidae. It was described by Martins in 1975. It is known from Brazil.
