= Trachysomus cavigibba =

Scientific classification
- Domain: Eukaryota
- Kingdom: Animalia
- Phylum: Arthropoda
- Class: Insecta
- Order: Coleoptera
- Suborder: Polyphaga
- Infraorder: Cucujiformia
- Family: Cerambycidae
- Genus: Trachysomus
- Species: T. cavigibba

Binomial name
- Trachysomus cavigibba Martins, 1975

Species of beetle

Trachysomus cavigibba is a species of beetle in the family Cerambycidae. It is known to inhabit Bolivia.
