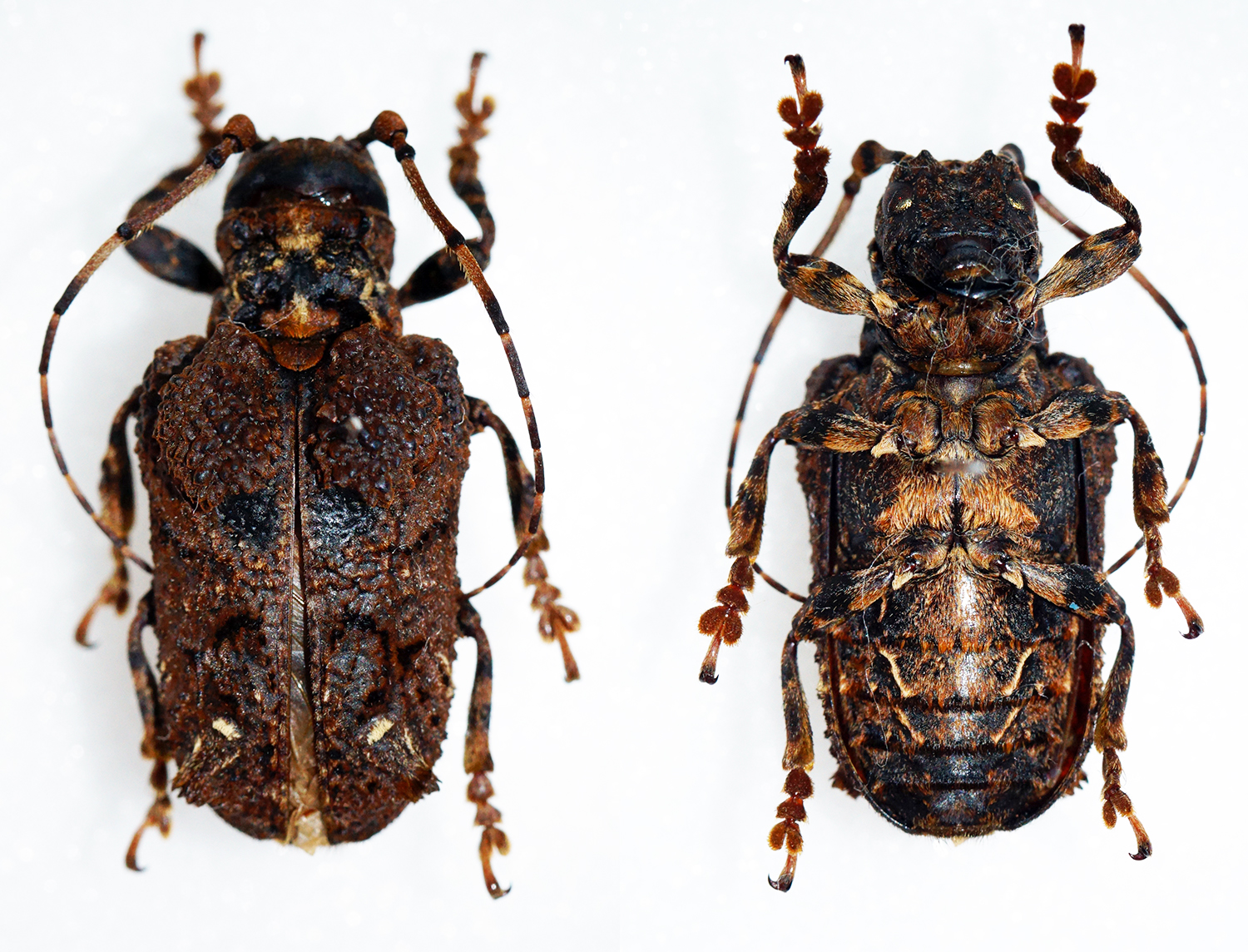
- Trachysomus fragifer (female)

Scientific classification
- Domain: Eukaryota
- Kingdom: Animalia
- Phylum: Arthropoda
- Class: Insecta
- Order: Coleoptera
- Suborder: Polyphaga
- Infraorder: Cucujiformia
- Family: Cerambycidae
- Genus: Trachysomus
- Species: T. fragifer

Binomial name
- Trachysomus fragifer (Kirby, 1818)

Synonyms
- Trachysomus fragiferus (Kirby, 1818)

= Trachysomus fragifer =

Species of beetle

Trachysomus fragifer is a species of beetle in the family Cerambycidae. It was described by William Kirby in 1818. It is known from Paraguay and Brazil.
