= Trachysomus camelus =

Scientific classification
- Domain: Eukaryota
- Kingdom: Animalia
- Phylum: Arthropoda
- Class: Insecta
- Order: Coleoptera
- Suborder: Polyphaga
- Infraorder: Cucujiformia
- Family: Cerambycidae
- Genus: Trachysomus
- Species: T. camelus

Binomial name
- Trachysomus camelus Buquet, 1852

Species of beetle

Trachysomus camelus is a species of beetle in the family Cerambycidae. It was described by Buquet in 1852. It is known from Brazil and French Guiana.
