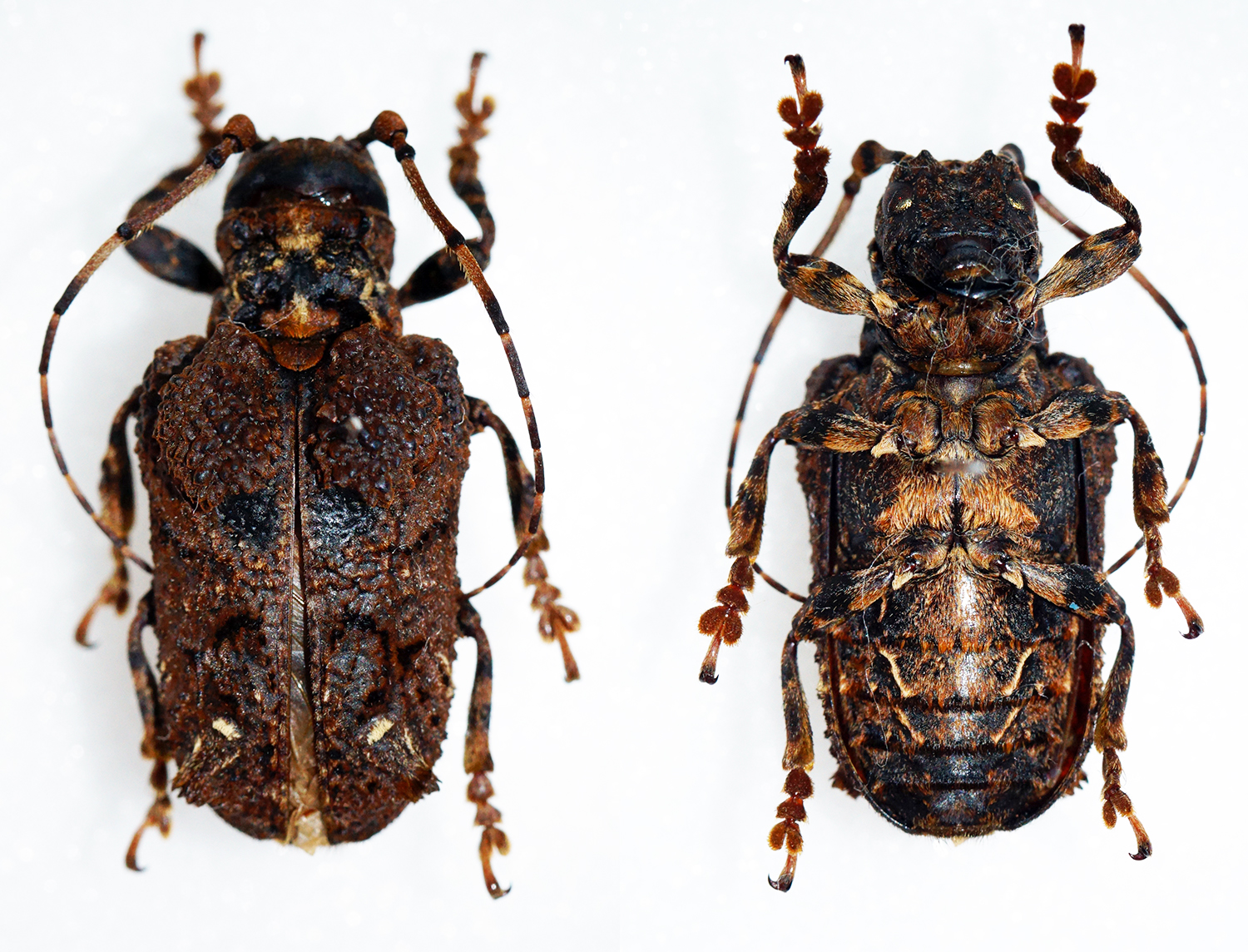
- Trachysomus fragifer (female)

Scientific classification
- Domain: Eukaryota
- Kingdom: Animalia
- Phylum: Arthropoda
- Class: Insecta
- Order: Coleoptera
- Suborder: Polyphaga
- Infraorder: Cucujiformia
- Family: Cerambycidae
- Subfamily: Lamiinae
- Tribe: Onciderini
- Genus: Trachysomus; Audinet-Serville, 1835

= Trachysomus =

Genus of beetles

Trachysomus is a genus of longhorn beetles of the subfamily Lamiinae.

== Species ==
- Trachysomus apipunga Martins & Galileo, 2008
- Trachysomus arriagadai Galileo & Martins, 1991
- Trachysomus buquetii Thomson, 1858
- Trachysomus camelus Buquet, 1852
- Trachysomus cavigibba Martins, 1975
- Trachysomus clarkei Martins & Galileo, 2009
- Trachysomus fragifer (Kirby, 1818)
- Trachysomus gibbosus Buquet, 1852
- Trachysomus hydaspes Dillon & Dillon, 1946
- Trachysomus luederwaldti Martins, 1975
- Trachysomus mexicanus Dillon & Dillon, 1946
- Trachysomus peregrinus Thomson, 1858
- Trachysomus santarensis Bates, 1865
- Trachysomus surdus Dillon & Dillon, 1946
- Trachysomus thomsoni Aurivillius, 1923
- Trachysomus verrucosus (Olivier, 1797)
- Trachysomus wappesi Martins & Galileo, 2009
