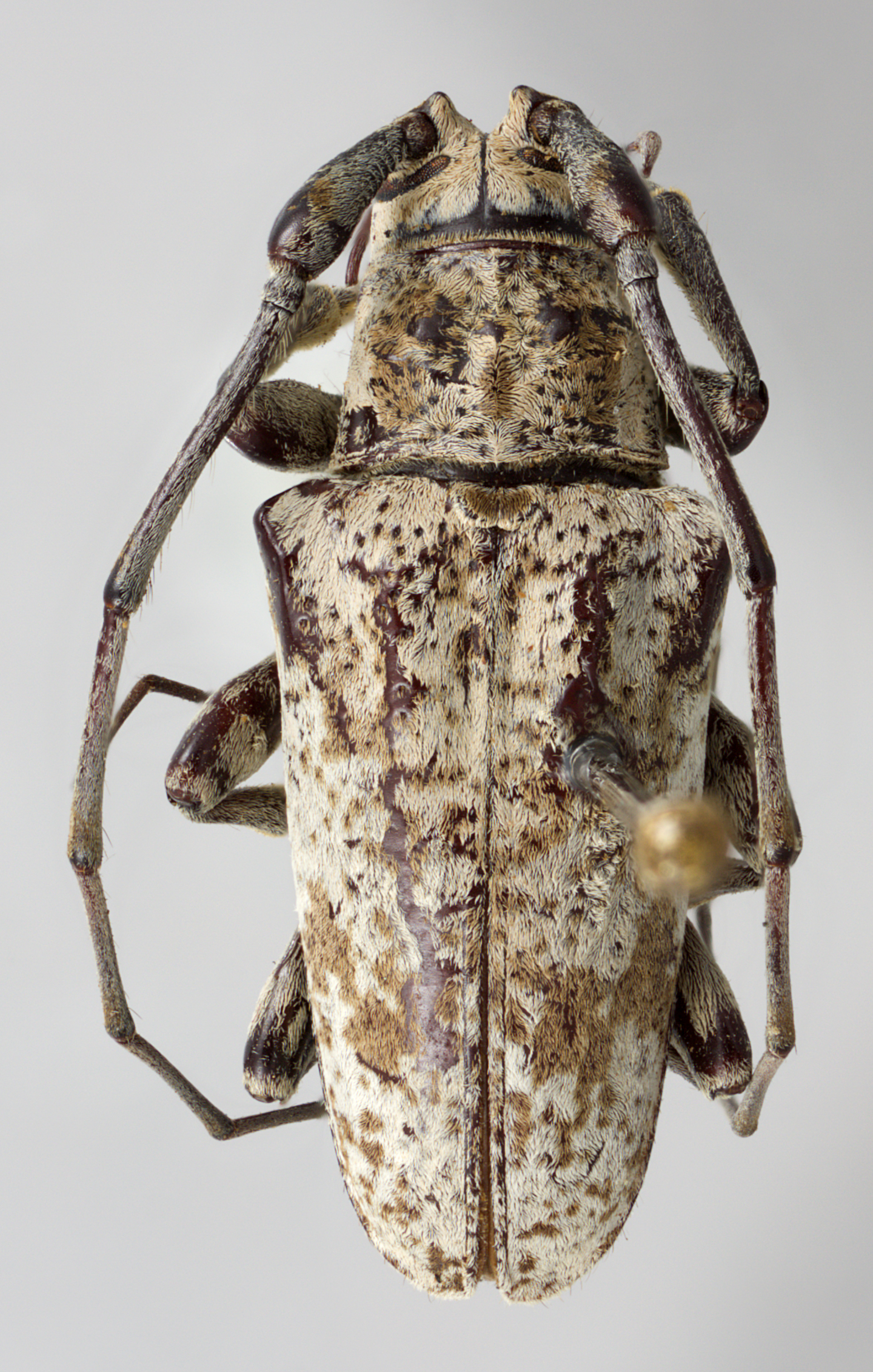
- Dorsal view of the unique BMNH Holotype from Venezuela

Scientific classification
- Kingdom: Animalia
- Phylum: Arthropoda
- Class: Insecta
- Order: Coleoptera
- Suborder: Polyphaga
- Infraorder: Cucujiformia
- Family: Cerambycidae
- Subfamily: Lamiinae
- Tribe: Onciderini
- Subtribe: Onciderina
- Genus: Lesbates; Dillon & Dillon, 1945

= Lesbates =

Genus of beetles

Lesbates is a genus of longhorn beetles of the subfamily Lamiinae, containing the following species:

- Lesbates acromii (Dalman, 1823)
- Lesbates axillaris (Thomson, 1860)
- Lesbates carissima Dillon & Dillon, 1945
- Lesbates caviunas (Dillon & Dillon, 1949)
