= Lesbates caviunas =

Scientific classification
- Kingdom: Animalia
- Phylum: Arthropoda
- Class: Insecta
- Order: Coleoptera
- Suborder: Polyphaga
- Infraorder: Cucujiformia
- Family: Cerambycidae
- Genus: Lesbates
- Species: L. caviunas

Binomial name
- Lesbates caviunas (Dillon & Dillon, 1949)

Species of beetle

Lesbates caviunas is a species of beetle in the family Cerambycidae. It was described by Dillon and Dillon in 1949. It is known from Brazil.
