= Lesbates axillaris =

Scientific classification
- Kingdom: Animalia
- Phylum: Arthropoda
- Class: Insecta
- Order: Coleoptera
- Suborder: Polyphaga
- Infraorder: Cucujiformia
- Family: Cerambycidae
- Genus: Lesbates
- Species: L. axillaris

Binomial name
- Lesbates axillaris (Thomson, 1860)

Species of beetle

Lesbates axillaris is a species of beetle in the family Cerambycidae. It was described by James Thomson in 1860. It is known from Brazil.
