= Lesbates acromii =

Scientific classification
- Kingdom: Animalia
- Phylum: Arthropoda
- Class: Insecta
- Order: Coleoptera
- Suborder: Polyphaga
- Infraorder: Cucujiformia
- Family: Cerambycidae
- Genus: Lesbates
- Species: L. acromii

Binomial name
- Lesbates acromii (Dalman, 1823)

Synonyms
- Hypsioma acromii (Dalman, 1823); Hypsioma omoplata Lacordaire, 1872; Lamia acromii Dalman, 1823

Species of beetle

Lesbates acromii is a species of beetle in the family Cerambycidae. It was described by Dalman in 1823. It is known from Brazil.
